

449001–449100 

|-bgcolor=#d6d6d6
| 449001 ||  || — || January 17, 2007 || Kitt Peak || Spacewatch || — || align=right | 2.5 km || 
|-id=002 bgcolor=#d6d6d6
| 449002 ||  || — || March 11, 2007 || Mount Lemmon || Mount Lemmon Survey || — || align=right | 1.8 km || 
|-id=003 bgcolor=#d6d6d6
| 449003 ||  || — || November 12, 2010 || Mount Lemmon || Mount Lemmon Survey || — || align=right | 3.2 km || 
|-id=004 bgcolor=#d6d6d6
| 449004 ||  || — || February 8, 2007 || Kitt Peak || Spacewatch || EOS || align=right | 1.6 km || 
|-id=005 bgcolor=#d6d6d6
| 449005 ||  || — || December 27, 2011 || Mount Lemmon || Mount Lemmon Survey || — || align=right | 2.9 km || 
|-id=006 bgcolor=#d6d6d6
| 449006 ||  || — || October 11, 2005 || Kitt Peak || Spacewatch || — || align=right | 1.7 km || 
|-id=007 bgcolor=#d6d6d6
| 449007 ||  || — || December 22, 2005 || Kitt Peak || Spacewatch || — || align=right | 3.0 km || 
|-id=008 bgcolor=#d6d6d6
| 449008 ||  || — || August 25, 1998 || Caussols || ODAS || — || align=right | 3.0 km || 
|-id=009 bgcolor=#d6d6d6
| 449009 ||  || — || September 3, 2010 || Mount Lemmon || Mount Lemmon Survey || EOS || align=right | 2.1 km || 
|-id=010 bgcolor=#d6d6d6
| 449010 ||  || — || October 7, 2004 || Kitt Peak || Spacewatch || VER || align=right | 2.8 km || 
|-id=011 bgcolor=#E9E9E9
| 449011 ||  || — || September 27, 2006 || Kitt Peak || Spacewatch || — || align=right | 1.6 km || 
|-id=012 bgcolor=#d6d6d6
| 449012 ||  || — || September 25, 2009 || Mount Lemmon || Mount Lemmon Survey || — || align=right | 3.7 km || 
|-id=013 bgcolor=#d6d6d6
| 449013 ||  || — || January 26, 2012 || Mount Lemmon || Mount Lemmon Survey || EOS || align=right | 1.6 km || 
|-id=014 bgcolor=#d6d6d6
| 449014 ||  || — || April 29, 2003 || Kitt Peak || Spacewatch || — || align=right | 2.6 km || 
|-id=015 bgcolor=#d6d6d6
| 449015 ||  || — || December 27, 2011 || Mount Lemmon || Mount Lemmon Survey || — || align=right | 3.4 km || 
|-id=016 bgcolor=#d6d6d6
| 449016 ||  || — || November 17, 1999 || Kitt Peak || Spacewatch || THM || align=right | 1.7 km || 
|-id=017 bgcolor=#E9E9E9
| 449017 ||  || — || November 17, 2006 || Catalina || CSS || — || align=right | 1.8 km || 
|-id=018 bgcolor=#d6d6d6
| 449018 ||  || — || December 24, 2011 || Mount Lemmon || Mount Lemmon Survey || — || align=right | 3.9 km || 
|-id=019 bgcolor=#E9E9E9
| 449019 ||  || — || January 5, 2012 || Kitt Peak || Spacewatch || — || align=right | 1.6 km || 
|-id=020 bgcolor=#E9E9E9
| 449020 ||  || — || September 17, 2010 || Mount Lemmon || Mount Lemmon Survey || — || align=right | 2.3 km || 
|-id=021 bgcolor=#d6d6d6
| 449021 ||  || — || February 25, 2007 || Kitt Peak || Spacewatch || — || align=right | 2.5 km || 
|-id=022 bgcolor=#d6d6d6
| 449022 ||  || — || June 21, 2009 || Kitt Peak || Spacewatch || — || align=right | 2.9 km || 
|-id=023 bgcolor=#d6d6d6
| 449023 ||  || — || July 17, 2010 || WISE || WISE || TRE || align=right | 3.1 km || 
|-id=024 bgcolor=#d6d6d6
| 449024 ||  || — || January 18, 2012 || Kitt Peak || Spacewatch || — || align=right | 2.8 km || 
|-id=025 bgcolor=#d6d6d6
| 449025 ||  || — || November 30, 2005 || Kitt Peak || Spacewatch || — || align=right | 2.7 km || 
|-id=026 bgcolor=#d6d6d6
| 449026 ||  || — || January 18, 2012 || Kitt Peak || Spacewatch || — || align=right | 2.7 km || 
|-id=027 bgcolor=#d6d6d6
| 449027 ||  || — || October 24, 2005 || Kitt Peak || Spacewatch || — || align=right | 2.6 km || 
|-id=028 bgcolor=#E9E9E9
| 449028 ||  || — || February 9, 2008 || Catalina || CSS || EUN || align=right | 1.3 km || 
|-id=029 bgcolor=#d6d6d6
| 449029 ||  || — || February 1, 2012 || Kitt Peak || Spacewatch || — || align=right | 3.3 km || 
|-id=030 bgcolor=#d6d6d6
| 449030 ||  || — || January 14, 2012 || Kitt Peak || Spacewatch || — || align=right | 3.7 km || 
|-id=031 bgcolor=#d6d6d6
| 449031 ||  || — || January 21, 2012 || Kitt Peak || Spacewatch || — || align=right | 3.0 km || 
|-id=032 bgcolor=#d6d6d6
| 449032 ||  || — || February 1, 2012 || Kitt Peak || Spacewatch || — || align=right | 3.3 km || 
|-id=033 bgcolor=#d6d6d6
| 449033 ||  || — || December 1, 2005 || Kitt Peak || Spacewatch || — || align=right | 3.5 km || 
|-id=034 bgcolor=#d6d6d6
| 449034 ||  || — || December 23, 2005 || Socorro || LINEAR || — || align=right | 2.3 km || 
|-id=035 bgcolor=#d6d6d6
| 449035 ||  || — || January 28, 2007 || Mount Lemmon || Mount Lemmon Survey || EOS || align=right | 1.4 km || 
|-id=036 bgcolor=#E9E9E9
| 449036 ||  || — || March 27, 2008 || Kitt Peak || Spacewatch || — || align=right | 2.5 km || 
|-id=037 bgcolor=#d6d6d6
| 449037 ||  || — || January 25, 2012 || Kitt Peak || Spacewatch || EMA || align=right | 2.6 km || 
|-id=038 bgcolor=#d6d6d6
| 449038 ||  || — || December 27, 2005 || Kitt Peak || Spacewatch || — || align=right | 3.0 km || 
|-id=039 bgcolor=#d6d6d6
| 449039 ||  || — || January 29, 2012 || Kitt Peak || Spacewatch || EOS || align=right | 2.0 km || 
|-id=040 bgcolor=#d6d6d6
| 449040 ||  || — || January 19, 2012 || Kitt Peak || Spacewatch || — || align=right | 3.6 km || 
|-id=041 bgcolor=#E9E9E9
| 449041 ||  || — || December 11, 2002 || Socorro || LINEAR || — || align=right | 1.6 km || 
|-id=042 bgcolor=#d6d6d6
| 449042 ||  || — || February 25, 2007 || Mount Lemmon || Mount Lemmon Survey || — || align=right | 2.7 km || 
|-id=043 bgcolor=#E9E9E9
| 449043 ||  || — || January 21, 2012 || Kitt Peak || Spacewatch || GEF || align=right | 1.0 km || 
|-id=044 bgcolor=#d6d6d6
| 449044 ||  || — || April 16, 2007 || Catalina || CSS || — || align=right | 2.4 km || 
|-id=045 bgcolor=#d6d6d6
| 449045 ||  || — || February 19, 2012 || Kitt Peak || Spacewatch || — || align=right | 2.8 km || 
|-id=046 bgcolor=#d6d6d6
| 449046 ||  || — || February 21, 2012 || Kitt Peak || Spacewatch || — || align=right | 2.6 km || 
|-id=047 bgcolor=#d6d6d6
| 449047 ||  || — || October 13, 2010 || Mount Lemmon || Mount Lemmon Survey || — || align=right | 2.9 km || 
|-id=048 bgcolor=#d6d6d6
| 449048 ||  || — || February 2, 2006 || Kitt Peak || Spacewatch || — || align=right | 3.3 km || 
|-id=049 bgcolor=#d6d6d6
| 449049 ||  || — || February 25, 2012 || Mount Lemmon || Mount Lemmon Survey || NAE || align=right | 1.9 km || 
|-id=050 bgcolor=#d6d6d6
| 449050 ||  || — || January 30, 2006 || Kitt Peak || Spacewatch || — || align=right | 2.8 km || 
|-id=051 bgcolor=#d6d6d6
| 449051 ||  || — || February 24, 2012 || Kitt Peak || Spacewatch || — || align=right | 3.0 km || 
|-id=052 bgcolor=#d6d6d6
| 449052 ||  || — || May 7, 2008 || Kitt Peak || Spacewatch || — || align=right | 3.1 km || 
|-id=053 bgcolor=#d6d6d6
| 449053 ||  || — || October 7, 2004 || Kitt Peak || Spacewatch || — || align=right | 3.7 km || 
|-id=054 bgcolor=#d6d6d6
| 449054 ||  || — || August 17, 2009 || Kitt Peak || Spacewatch || — || align=right | 4.3 km || 
|-id=055 bgcolor=#d6d6d6
| 449055 ||  || — || January 22, 2006 || Catalina || CSS || — || align=right | 4.0 km || 
|-id=056 bgcolor=#d6d6d6
| 449056 ||  || — || January 23, 2006 || Kitt Peak || Spacewatch || — || align=right | 2.3 km || 
|-id=057 bgcolor=#d6d6d6
| 449057 ||  || — || October 31, 2010 || Mount Lemmon || Mount Lemmon Survey || — || align=right | 2.8 km || 
|-id=058 bgcolor=#d6d6d6
| 449058 ||  || — || February 17, 2007 || Kitt Peak || Spacewatch || EOS || align=right | 2.0 km || 
|-id=059 bgcolor=#d6d6d6
| 449059 ||  || — || September 23, 2009 || Mount Lemmon || Mount Lemmon Survey || — || align=right | 3.4 km || 
|-id=060 bgcolor=#d6d6d6
| 449060 ||  || — || September 25, 2009 || Kitt Peak || Spacewatch || — || align=right | 3.4 km || 
|-id=061 bgcolor=#d6d6d6
| 449061 ||  || — || December 5, 2005 || Kitt Peak || Spacewatch || — || align=right | 2.5 km || 
|-id=062 bgcolor=#d6d6d6
| 449062 ||  || — || November 25, 2005 || Catalina || CSS || — || align=right | 2.6 km || 
|-id=063 bgcolor=#d6d6d6
| 449063 ||  || — || August 18, 2009 || Kitt Peak || Spacewatch || — || align=right | 2.8 km || 
|-id=064 bgcolor=#d6d6d6
| 449064 ||  || — || October 12, 2004 || Kitt Peak || Spacewatch || — || align=right | 2.3 km || 
|-id=065 bgcolor=#d6d6d6
| 449065 ||  || — || February 21, 2012 || Kitt Peak || Spacewatch || — || align=right | 2.7 km || 
|-id=066 bgcolor=#d6d6d6
| 449066 ||  || — || October 9, 2004 || Kitt Peak || Spacewatch || — || align=right | 2.9 km || 
|-id=067 bgcolor=#d6d6d6
| 449067 ||  || — || July 25, 2010 || WISE || WISE || — || align=right | 3.6 km || 
|-id=068 bgcolor=#d6d6d6
| 449068 ||  || — || December 10, 2010 || Mount Lemmon || Mount Lemmon Survey || — || align=right | 2.7 km || 
|-id=069 bgcolor=#d6d6d6
| 449069 ||  || — || July 31, 2009 || Kitt Peak || Spacewatch || — || align=right | 3.7 km || 
|-id=070 bgcolor=#d6d6d6
| 449070 ||  || — || January 21, 2006 || Mount Lemmon || Mount Lemmon Survey || THM || align=right | 2.0 km || 
|-id=071 bgcolor=#d6d6d6
| 449071 ||  || — || January 27, 2007 || Mount Lemmon || Mount Lemmon Survey || — || align=right | 3.8 km || 
|-id=072 bgcolor=#d6d6d6
| 449072 ||  || — || March 16, 2007 || Mount Lemmon || Mount Lemmon Survey || — || align=right | 2.7 km || 
|-id=073 bgcolor=#d6d6d6
| 449073 ||  || — || October 30, 2010 || Kitt Peak || Spacewatch || — || align=right | 2.7 km || 
|-id=074 bgcolor=#FFC2E0
| 449074 ||  || — || March 29, 2012 || Mount Lemmon || Mount Lemmon Survey || AMO || align=right data-sort-value="0.51" | 510 m || 
|-id=075 bgcolor=#d6d6d6
| 449075 ||  || — || February 26, 2006 || Kitt Peak || Spacewatch || — || align=right | 2.3 km || 
|-id=076 bgcolor=#d6d6d6
| 449076 ||  || — || September 1, 1998 || Kitt Peak || Spacewatch || — || align=right | 3.5 km || 
|-id=077 bgcolor=#d6d6d6
| 449077 ||  || — || November 10, 2004 || Kitt Peak || Spacewatch || — || align=right | 3.4 km || 
|-id=078 bgcolor=#d6d6d6
| 449078 ||  || — || March 27, 2012 || Mount Lemmon || Mount Lemmon Survey || — || align=right | 3.5 km || 
|-id=079 bgcolor=#d6d6d6
| 449079 ||  || — || September 27, 2009 || Kitt Peak || Spacewatch || — || align=right | 3.5 km || 
|-id=080 bgcolor=#d6d6d6
| 449080 ||  || — || November 11, 2004 || Kitt Peak || Spacewatch || — || align=right | 4.1 km || 
|-id=081 bgcolor=#d6d6d6
| 449081 ||  || — || December 11, 2010 || Mount Lemmon || Mount Lemmon Survey || — || align=right | 3.2 km || 
|-id=082 bgcolor=#d6d6d6
| 449082 ||  || — || March 25, 2006 || Kitt Peak || Spacewatch || — || align=right | 3.3 km || 
|-id=083 bgcolor=#fefefe
| 449083 ||  || — || January 26, 2006 || Mount Lemmon || Mount Lemmon Survey || H || align=right data-sort-value="0.83" | 830 m || 
|-id=084 bgcolor=#fefefe
| 449084 ||  || — || September 21, 1998 || Anderson Mesa || LONEOS || H || align=right data-sort-value="0.75" | 750 m || 
|-id=085 bgcolor=#fefefe
| 449085 ||  || — || February 25, 2011 || Mount Lemmon || Mount Lemmon Survey || — || align=right data-sort-value="0.60" | 600 m || 
|-id=086 bgcolor=#FA8072
| 449086 ||  || — || October 21, 2009 || Mount Lemmon || Mount Lemmon Survey || critical || align=right data-sort-value="0.49" | 490 m || 
|-id=087 bgcolor=#fefefe
| 449087 ||  || — || September 15, 2012 || Kitt Peak || Spacewatch || (883) || align=right data-sort-value="0.75" | 750 m || 
|-id=088 bgcolor=#fefefe
| 449088 ||  || — || June 15, 2009 || Kitt Peak || Spacewatch || H || align=right data-sort-value="0.63" | 630 m || 
|-id=089 bgcolor=#FFC2E0
| 449089 ||  || — || September 19, 2012 || Mount Lemmon || Mount Lemmon Survey || APO || align=right data-sort-value="0.34" | 340 m || 
|-id=090 bgcolor=#fefefe
| 449090 ||  || — || October 9, 2012 || Mount Lemmon || Mount Lemmon Survey || — || align=right data-sort-value="0.64" | 640 m || 
|-id=091 bgcolor=#fefefe
| 449091 ||  || — || September 23, 2012 || Mount Lemmon || Mount Lemmon Survey || H || align=right data-sort-value="0.75" | 750 m || 
|-id=092 bgcolor=#fefefe
| 449092 ||  || — || March 2, 2011 || Catalina || CSS || H || align=right data-sort-value="0.80" | 800 m || 
|-id=093 bgcolor=#fefefe
| 449093 ||  || — || October 31, 1999 || Kitt Peak || Spacewatch || — || align=right data-sort-value="0.54" | 540 m || 
|-id=094 bgcolor=#fefefe
| 449094 ||  || — || October 28, 2005 || Kitt Peak || Spacewatch || — || align=right data-sort-value="0.88" | 880 m || 
|-id=095 bgcolor=#fefefe
| 449095 ||  || — || December 15, 2006 || Kitt Peak || Spacewatch || — || align=right data-sort-value="0.64" | 640 m || 
|-id=096 bgcolor=#fefefe
| 449096 ||  || — || March 29, 2011 || Kitt Peak || Spacewatch || — || align=right data-sort-value="0.89" | 890 m || 
|-id=097 bgcolor=#C7FF8F
| 449097 ||  || — || October 22, 2011 || Mount Lemmon || Mount Lemmon Survey || centaur || align=right | 56 km || 
|-id=098 bgcolor=#fefefe
| 449098 ||  || — || October 21, 1995 || Kitt Peak || Spacewatch || — || align=right data-sort-value="0.65" | 650 m || 
|-id=099 bgcolor=#fefefe
| 449099 ||  || — || October 16, 2012 || Mount Lemmon || Mount Lemmon Survey || — || align=right data-sort-value="0.82" | 820 m || 
|-id=100 bgcolor=#fefefe
| 449100 ||  || — || March 30, 2011 || Mount Lemmon || Mount Lemmon Survey || — || align=right data-sort-value="0.54" | 540 m || 
|}

449101–449200 

|-bgcolor=#fefefe
| 449101 ||  || — || October 16, 1999 || Kitt Peak || Spacewatch || — || align=right data-sort-value="0.77" | 770 m || 
|-id=102 bgcolor=#fefefe
| 449102 ||  || — || December 20, 2005 || Socorro || LINEAR || — || align=right | 1.1 km || 
|-id=103 bgcolor=#fefefe
| 449103 ||  || — || November 4, 2012 || Kitt Peak || Spacewatch || — || align=right data-sort-value="0.72" | 720 m || 
|-id=104 bgcolor=#fefefe
| 449104 ||  || — || October 17, 2012 || Mount Lemmon || Mount Lemmon Survey || — || align=right data-sort-value="0.82" | 820 m || 
|-id=105 bgcolor=#fefefe
| 449105 ||  || — || October 20, 2012 || Kitt Peak || Spacewatch || — || align=right data-sort-value="0.66" | 660 m || 
|-id=106 bgcolor=#fefefe
| 449106 ||  || — || October 30, 2005 || Kitt Peak || Spacewatch || — || align=right data-sort-value="0.63" | 630 m || 
|-id=107 bgcolor=#FFC2E0
| 449107 ||  || — || November 14, 2012 || Nogales || Tenagra II Obs. || APO || align=right data-sort-value="0.41" | 410 m || 
|-id=108 bgcolor=#fefefe
| 449108 ||  || — || January 10, 2007 || Kitt Peak || Spacewatch || — || align=right data-sort-value="0.53" | 530 m || 
|-id=109 bgcolor=#fefefe
| 449109 ||  || — || February 10, 2007 || Mount Lemmon || Mount Lemmon Survey || — || align=right data-sort-value="0.50" | 500 m || 
|-id=110 bgcolor=#fefefe
| 449110 ||  || — || January 28, 2003 || Kitt Peak || Spacewatch || — || align=right data-sort-value="0.78" | 780 m || 
|-id=111 bgcolor=#fefefe
| 449111 ||  || — || September 26, 2005 || Kitt Peak || Spacewatch || — || align=right data-sort-value="0.81" | 810 m || 
|-id=112 bgcolor=#E9E9E9
| 449112 ||  || — || December 6, 2012 || Mount Lemmon || Mount Lemmon Survey || — || align=right | 1.4 km || 
|-id=113 bgcolor=#fefefe
| 449113 ||  || — || January 17, 2007 || Kitt Peak || Spacewatch || — || align=right data-sort-value="0.65" | 650 m || 
|-id=114 bgcolor=#fefefe
| 449114 ||  || — || December 6, 2012 || Kitt Peak || Spacewatch || — || align=right data-sort-value="0.99" | 990 m || 
|-id=115 bgcolor=#fefefe
| 449115 ||  || — || April 6, 2011 || Kitt Peak || Spacewatch || — || align=right data-sort-value="0.87" | 870 m || 
|-id=116 bgcolor=#fefefe
| 449116 ||  || — || December 8, 2005 || Mount Lemmon || Mount Lemmon Survey || — || align=right data-sort-value="0.86" | 860 m || 
|-id=117 bgcolor=#fefefe
| 449117 ||  || — || December 8, 2012 || Kitt Peak || Spacewatch || — || align=right data-sort-value="0.62" | 620 m || 
|-id=118 bgcolor=#fefefe
| 449118 ||  || — || December 18, 2009 || Mount Lemmon || Mount Lemmon Survey || — || align=right data-sort-value="0.57" | 570 m || 
|-id=119 bgcolor=#E9E9E9
| 449119 ||  || — || December 4, 2007 || Kitt Peak || Spacewatch || — || align=right | 1.3 km || 
|-id=120 bgcolor=#FA8072
| 449120 ||  || — || December 18, 2012 || Socorro || LINEAR || — || align=right | 1.2 km || 
|-id=121 bgcolor=#E9E9E9
| 449121 ||  || — || February 14, 2005 || Kitt Peak || Spacewatch || — || align=right data-sort-value="0.97" | 970 m || 
|-id=122 bgcolor=#fefefe
| 449122 ||  || — || March 20, 2010 || Siding Spring || SSS || — || align=right data-sort-value="0.90" | 900 m || 
|-id=123 bgcolor=#fefefe
| 449123 ||  || — || November 1, 2008 || Mount Lemmon || Mount Lemmon Survey || — || align=right | 1.0 km || 
|-id=124 bgcolor=#fefefe
| 449124 ||  || — || October 2, 2008 || Mount Lemmon || Mount Lemmon Survey || — || align=right data-sort-value="0.76" | 760 m || 
|-id=125 bgcolor=#fefefe
| 449125 ||  || — || September 29, 2008 || Mount Lemmon || Mount Lemmon Survey || NYS || align=right data-sort-value="0.69" | 690 m || 
|-id=126 bgcolor=#fefefe
| 449126 ||  || — || November 22, 2005 || Kitt Peak || Spacewatch || — || align=right data-sort-value="0.64" | 640 m || 
|-id=127 bgcolor=#fefefe
| 449127 ||  || — || September 25, 2005 || Kitt Peak || Spacewatch || — || align=right data-sort-value="0.71" | 710 m || 
|-id=128 bgcolor=#fefefe
| 449128 ||  || — || February 7, 2006 || Mount Lemmon || Mount Lemmon Survey || — || align=right data-sort-value="0.78" | 780 m || 
|-id=129 bgcolor=#E9E9E9
| 449129 ||  || — || January 25, 2009 || Kitt Peak || Spacewatch || — || align=right | 1.5 km || 
|-id=130 bgcolor=#fefefe
| 449130 ||  || — || October 1, 2008 || Mount Lemmon || Mount Lemmon Survey || — || align=right data-sort-value="0.88" | 880 m || 
|-id=131 bgcolor=#E9E9E9
| 449131 ||  || — || January 6, 2005 || Catalina || CSS || — || align=right | 2.8 km || 
|-id=132 bgcolor=#fefefe
| 449132 ||  || — || December 10, 2005 || Kitt Peak || Spacewatch || — || align=right data-sort-value="0.75" | 750 m || 
|-id=133 bgcolor=#fefefe
| 449133 ||  || — || April 14, 2010 || Mount Lemmon || Mount Lemmon Survey || — || align=right data-sort-value="0.82" | 820 m || 
|-id=134 bgcolor=#E9E9E9
| 449134 ||  || — || January 18, 2009 || Kitt Peak || Spacewatch || — || align=right | 2.7 km || 
|-id=135 bgcolor=#fefefe
| 449135 ||  || — || April 2, 2006 || Kitt Peak || Spacewatch || NYS || align=right data-sort-value="0.69" | 690 m || 
|-id=136 bgcolor=#fefefe
| 449136 ||  || — || October 24, 2008 || Kitt Peak || Spacewatch || — || align=right data-sort-value="0.94" | 940 m || 
|-id=137 bgcolor=#fefefe
| 449137 ||  || — || January 5, 1994 || Kitt Peak || Spacewatch || MAS || align=right data-sort-value="0.71" | 710 m || 
|-id=138 bgcolor=#E9E9E9
| 449138 ||  || — || April 17, 2010 || WISE || WISE || BRG || align=right | 2.2 km || 
|-id=139 bgcolor=#fefefe
| 449139 ||  || — || February 24, 2006 || Kitt Peak || Spacewatch || NYS || align=right data-sort-value="0.50" | 500 m || 
|-id=140 bgcolor=#fefefe
| 449140 ||  || — || April 9, 2010 || Kitt Peak || Spacewatch || — || align=right data-sort-value="0.94" | 940 m || 
|-id=141 bgcolor=#E9E9E9
| 449141 ||  || — || March 18, 2005 || Catalina || CSS || — || align=right | 1.6 km || 
|-id=142 bgcolor=#fefefe
| 449142 ||  || — || December 2, 2005 || Kitt Peak || Spacewatch || — || align=right data-sort-value="0.80" | 800 m || 
|-id=143 bgcolor=#E9E9E9
| 449143 ||  || — || January 10, 2013 || Kitt Peak || Spacewatch || — || align=right | 2.1 km || 
|-id=144 bgcolor=#fefefe
| 449144 ||  || — || January 28, 2006 || Kitt Peak || Spacewatch || — || align=right data-sort-value="0.81" | 810 m || 
|-id=145 bgcolor=#fefefe
| 449145 ||  || — || November 10, 2004 || Kitt Peak || Spacewatch || — || align=right data-sort-value="0.76" | 760 m || 
|-id=146 bgcolor=#fefefe
| 449146 ||  || — || April 20, 2006 || Kitt Peak || Spacewatch || V || align=right data-sort-value="0.66" | 660 m || 
|-id=147 bgcolor=#fefefe
| 449147 ||  || — || January 7, 2006 || Mount Lemmon || Mount Lemmon Survey || — || align=right data-sort-value="0.52" | 520 m || 
|-id=148 bgcolor=#fefefe
| 449148 ||  || — || April 16, 2007 || Catalina || CSS || — || align=right data-sort-value="0.87" | 870 m || 
|-id=149 bgcolor=#E9E9E9
| 449149 ||  || — || January 9, 2013 || Kitt Peak || Spacewatch || — || align=right | 2.7 km || 
|-id=150 bgcolor=#fefefe
| 449150 ||  || — || December 24, 1998 || Kitt Peak || Spacewatch || — || align=right data-sort-value="0.84" | 840 m || 
|-id=151 bgcolor=#fefefe
| 449151 ||  || — || January 12, 2002 || Kitt Peak || Spacewatch || — || align=right | 1.0 km || 
|-id=152 bgcolor=#fefefe
| 449152 ||  || — || September 13, 2007 || Mount Lemmon || Mount Lemmon Survey || NYS || align=right data-sort-value="0.74" | 740 m || 
|-id=153 bgcolor=#fefefe
| 449153 ||  || — || September 25, 2008 || Mount Lemmon || Mount Lemmon Survey || — || align=right data-sort-value="0.66" | 660 m || 
|-id=154 bgcolor=#fefefe
| 449154 ||  || — || January 4, 2013 || Kitt Peak || Spacewatch || — || align=right data-sort-value="0.82" | 820 m || 
|-id=155 bgcolor=#E9E9E9
| 449155 ||  || — || October 15, 2007 || Mount Lemmon || Mount Lemmon Survey || — || align=right | 1.1 km || 
|-id=156 bgcolor=#E9E9E9
| 449156 ||  || — || January 6, 2013 || Kitt Peak || Spacewatch || — || align=right | 1.3 km || 
|-id=157 bgcolor=#fefefe
| 449157 ||  || — || October 7, 2008 || Mount Lemmon || Mount Lemmon Survey || — || align=right data-sort-value="0.82" | 820 m || 
|-id=158 bgcolor=#fefefe
| 449158 ||  || — || October 21, 2001 || Kitt Peak || Spacewatch || NYS || align=right data-sort-value="0.50" | 500 m || 
|-id=159 bgcolor=#fefefe
| 449159 ||  || — || December 26, 2005 || Mount Lemmon || Mount Lemmon Survey || — || align=right data-sort-value="0.71" | 710 m || 
|-id=160 bgcolor=#fefefe
| 449160 ||  || — || January 27, 2010 || WISE || WISE || — || align=right | 2.3 km || 
|-id=161 bgcolor=#fefefe
| 449161 ||  || — || February 8, 2002 || Socorro || LINEAR || — || align=right data-sort-value="0.97" | 970 m || 
|-id=162 bgcolor=#fefefe
| 449162 ||  || — || January 23, 2006 || Kitt Peak || Spacewatch || — || align=right data-sort-value="0.69" | 690 m || 
|-id=163 bgcolor=#d6d6d6
| 449163 ||  || — || September 14, 2009 || Catalina || CSS || Tj (2.99) || align=right | 4.2 km || 
|-id=164 bgcolor=#E9E9E9
| 449164 ||  || — || October 14, 2007 || Mount Lemmon || Mount Lemmon Survey || — || align=right | 1.4 km || 
|-id=165 bgcolor=#fefefe
| 449165 ||  || — || October 20, 2008 || Mount Lemmon || Mount Lemmon Survey || — || align=right data-sort-value="0.90" | 900 m || 
|-id=166 bgcolor=#E9E9E9
| 449166 ||  || — || November 14, 1998 || Kitt Peak || Spacewatch || — || align=right | 2.1 km || 
|-id=167 bgcolor=#fefefe
| 449167 ||  || — || September 23, 2008 || Mount Lemmon || Mount Lemmon Survey || — || align=right data-sort-value="0.70" | 700 m || 
|-id=168 bgcolor=#fefefe
| 449168 ||  || — || May 28, 2011 || Mount Lemmon || Mount Lemmon Survey || — || align=right | 1.2 km || 
|-id=169 bgcolor=#fefefe
| 449169 ||  || — || January 18, 2013 || Mount Lemmon || Mount Lemmon Survey || — || align=right data-sort-value="0.82" | 820 m || 
|-id=170 bgcolor=#E9E9E9
| 449170 ||  || — || January 31, 2009 || Kitt Peak || Spacewatch || — || align=right | 1.6 km || 
|-id=171 bgcolor=#fefefe
| 449171 ||  || — || November 6, 2008 || Kitt Peak || Spacewatch || V || align=right data-sort-value="0.78" | 780 m || 
|-id=172 bgcolor=#E9E9E9
| 449172 ||  || — || February 4, 2000 || Kitt Peak || Spacewatch || EUN || align=right | 1.3 km || 
|-id=173 bgcolor=#fefefe
| 449173 ||  || — || December 28, 2005 || Kitt Peak || Spacewatch || — || align=right data-sort-value="0.68" | 680 m || 
|-id=174 bgcolor=#fefefe
| 449174 ||  || — || March 26, 2006 || Kitt Peak || Spacewatch || — || align=right data-sort-value="0.67" | 670 m || 
|-id=175 bgcolor=#E9E9E9
| 449175 ||  || — || March 19, 2009 || Mount Lemmon || Mount Lemmon Survey || — || align=right | 1.3 km || 
|-id=176 bgcolor=#fefefe
| 449176 ||  || — || October 22, 2008 || Kitt Peak || Spacewatch || — || align=right data-sort-value="0.68" | 680 m || 
|-id=177 bgcolor=#fefefe
| 449177 ||  || — || July 30, 2008 || Mount Lemmon || Mount Lemmon Survey || — || align=right data-sort-value="0.48" | 480 m || 
|-id=178 bgcolor=#E9E9E9
| 449178 ||  || — || May 31, 2010 || WISE || WISE || — || align=right | 3.4 km || 
|-id=179 bgcolor=#E9E9E9
| 449179 ||  || — || November 1, 2007 || Mount Lemmon || Mount Lemmon Survey || — || align=right data-sort-value="0.98" | 980 m || 
|-id=180 bgcolor=#fefefe
| 449180 ||  || — || December 1, 2008 || Kitt Peak || Spacewatch || V || align=right data-sort-value="0.62" | 620 m || 
|-id=181 bgcolor=#fefefe
| 449181 ||  || — || January 4, 2013 || Kitt Peak || Spacewatch || — || align=right data-sort-value="0.61" | 610 m || 
|-id=182 bgcolor=#fefefe
| 449182 ||  || — || October 20, 2008 || Kitt Peak || Spacewatch || — || align=right data-sort-value="0.61" | 610 m || 
|-id=183 bgcolor=#fefefe
| 449183 ||  || — || February 2, 2006 || Kitt Peak || Spacewatch || V || align=right data-sort-value="0.72" | 720 m || 
|-id=184 bgcolor=#fefefe
| 449184 ||  || — || April 25, 2007 || Kitt Peak || Spacewatch || — || align=right data-sort-value="0.64" | 640 m || 
|-id=185 bgcolor=#E9E9E9
| 449185 ||  || — || January 19, 2013 || Kitt Peak || Spacewatch || RAF || align=right data-sort-value="0.94" | 940 m || 
|-id=186 bgcolor=#E9E9E9
| 449186 ||  || — || January 18, 2013 || Kitt Peak || Spacewatch || — || align=right | 1.7 km || 
|-id=187 bgcolor=#E9E9E9
| 449187 ||  || — || March 4, 2005 || Mount Lemmon || Mount Lemmon Survey || — || align=right data-sort-value="0.75" | 750 m || 
|-id=188 bgcolor=#fefefe
| 449188 ||  || — || February 21, 2006 || Mount Lemmon || Mount Lemmon Survey || — || align=right data-sort-value="0.65" | 650 m || 
|-id=189 bgcolor=#fefefe
| 449189 ||  || — || November 24, 2008 || Mount Lemmon || Mount Lemmon Survey || — || align=right data-sort-value="0.89" | 890 m || 
|-id=190 bgcolor=#E9E9E9
| 449190 ||  || — || April 10, 2010 || WISE || WISE || — || align=right | 2.3 km || 
|-id=191 bgcolor=#fefefe
| 449191 ||  || — || December 1, 2008 || Kitt Peak || Spacewatch || NYS || align=right data-sort-value="0.69" | 690 m || 
|-id=192 bgcolor=#fefefe
| 449192 ||  || — || March 24, 2006 || Mount Lemmon || Mount Lemmon Survey || NYS || align=right data-sort-value="0.66" | 660 m || 
|-id=193 bgcolor=#d6d6d6
| 449193 ||  || — || March 1, 2008 || Kitt Peak || Spacewatch || — || align=right | 3.2 km || 
|-id=194 bgcolor=#fefefe
| 449194 ||  || — || December 1, 2005 || Mount Lemmon || Mount Lemmon Survey || — || align=right data-sort-value="0.94" | 940 m || 
|-id=195 bgcolor=#fefefe
| 449195 ||  || — || January 15, 2009 || Kitt Peak || Spacewatch || — || align=right data-sort-value="0.77" | 770 m || 
|-id=196 bgcolor=#E9E9E9
| 449196 ||  || — || August 27, 2006 || Kitt Peak || Spacewatch || — || align=right | 2.2 km || 
|-id=197 bgcolor=#E9E9E9
| 449197 ||  || — || March 27, 2009 || Catalina || CSS || ADE || align=right | 2.3 km || 
|-id=198 bgcolor=#E9E9E9
| 449198 ||  || — || September 16, 2003 || Kitt Peak || Spacewatch || — || align=right data-sort-value="0.98" | 980 m || 
|-id=199 bgcolor=#fefefe
| 449199 ||  || — || October 9, 2004 || Kitt Peak || Spacewatch || — || align=right data-sort-value="0.80" | 800 m || 
|-id=200 bgcolor=#fefefe
| 449200 ||  || — || December 31, 2008 || Kitt Peak || Spacewatch || V || align=right data-sort-value="0.57" | 570 m || 
|}

449201–449300 

|-bgcolor=#fefefe
| 449201 ||  || — || December 4, 2008 || Socorro || LINEAR || — || align=right data-sort-value="0.78" | 780 m || 
|-id=202 bgcolor=#E9E9E9
| 449202 ||  || — || May 7, 2010 || WISE || WISE || — || align=right | 3.2 km || 
|-id=203 bgcolor=#fefefe
| 449203 ||  || — || November 19, 2008 || Mount Lemmon || Mount Lemmon Survey || — || align=right data-sort-value="0.85" | 850 m || 
|-id=204 bgcolor=#E9E9E9
| 449204 ||  || — || September 25, 2006 || Mount Lemmon || Mount Lemmon Survey || AGN || align=right | 1.1 km || 
|-id=205 bgcolor=#E9E9E9
| 449205 ||  || — || November 11, 2007 || Mount Lemmon || Mount Lemmon Survey || — || align=right | 3.5 km || 
|-id=206 bgcolor=#E9E9E9
| 449206 ||  || — || September 26, 2006 || Kitt Peak || Spacewatch || — || align=right | 2.6 km || 
|-id=207 bgcolor=#fefefe
| 449207 ||  || — || December 22, 2008 || Kitt Peak || Spacewatch || V || align=right data-sort-value="0.68" | 680 m || 
|-id=208 bgcolor=#E9E9E9
| 449208 ||  || — || April 12, 2004 || Kitt Peak || Spacewatch || — || align=right | 2.0 km || 
|-id=209 bgcolor=#fefefe
| 449209 ||  || — || March 3, 2006 || Kitt Peak || Spacewatch || V || align=right data-sort-value="0.60" | 600 m || 
|-id=210 bgcolor=#E9E9E9
| 449210 ||  || — || February 19, 2009 || Catalina || CSS || — || align=right | 1.7 km || 
|-id=211 bgcolor=#fefefe
| 449211 ||  || — || January 7, 2002 || Kitt Peak || Spacewatch || — || align=right data-sort-value="0.64" | 640 m || 
|-id=212 bgcolor=#E9E9E9
| 449212 ||  || — || October 20, 2007 || Mount Lemmon || Mount Lemmon Survey || — || align=right | 1.2 km || 
|-id=213 bgcolor=#fefefe
| 449213 ||  || — || December 5, 2008 || Kitt Peak || Spacewatch || — || align=right data-sort-value="0.71" | 710 m || 
|-id=214 bgcolor=#fefefe
| 449214 ||  || — || June 15, 2007 || Kitt Peak || Spacewatch || V || align=right data-sort-value="0.76" | 760 m || 
|-id=215 bgcolor=#E9E9E9
| 449215 ||  || — || June 28, 1998 || Kitt Peak || Spacewatch || — || align=right | 1.2 km || 
|-id=216 bgcolor=#E9E9E9
| 449216 ||  || — || November 24, 2008 || Mount Lemmon || Mount Lemmon Survey || — || align=right | 1.6 km || 
|-id=217 bgcolor=#E9E9E9
| 449217 ||  || — || February 1, 2009 || Mount Lemmon || Mount Lemmon Survey || — || align=right data-sort-value="0.80" | 800 m || 
|-id=218 bgcolor=#E9E9E9
| 449218 ||  || — || November 14, 2007 || Kitt Peak || Spacewatch || MIS || align=right | 3.0 km || 
|-id=219 bgcolor=#fefefe
| 449219 ||  || — || October 7, 2004 || Kitt Peak || Spacewatch || — || align=right data-sort-value="0.60" | 600 m || 
|-id=220 bgcolor=#fefefe
| 449220 ||  || — || January 8, 2013 || Mount Lemmon || Mount Lemmon Survey || MAS || align=right data-sort-value="0.65" | 650 m || 
|-id=221 bgcolor=#E9E9E9
| 449221 ||  || — || April 12, 2004 || Kitt Peak || Spacewatch || — || align=right | 1.9 km || 
|-id=222 bgcolor=#fefefe
| 449222 ||  || — || January 31, 2006 || Kitt Peak || Spacewatch || V || align=right data-sort-value="0.50" | 500 m || 
|-id=223 bgcolor=#fefefe
| 449223 ||  || — || January 17, 2013 || Mount Lemmon || Mount Lemmon Survey || — || align=right data-sort-value="0.98" | 980 m || 
|-id=224 bgcolor=#d6d6d6
| 449224 ||  || — || August 10, 2010 || Kitt Peak || Spacewatch || — || align=right | 3.0 km || 
|-id=225 bgcolor=#d6d6d6
| 449225 ||  || — || January 20, 2013 || Kitt Peak || Spacewatch || — || align=right | 3.5 km || 
|-id=226 bgcolor=#fefefe
| 449226 ||  || — || May 3, 2006 || Mount Lemmon || Mount Lemmon Survey || — || align=right data-sort-value="0.93" | 930 m || 
|-id=227 bgcolor=#fefefe
| 449227 ||  || — || November 9, 2008 || Mount Lemmon || Mount Lemmon Survey || — || align=right data-sort-value="0.91" | 910 m || 
|-id=228 bgcolor=#fefefe
| 449228 ||  || — || April 13, 2002 || Kitt Peak || Spacewatch || — || align=right data-sort-value="0.75" | 750 m || 
|-id=229 bgcolor=#fefefe
| 449229 ||  || — || December 19, 2004 || Mount Lemmon || Mount Lemmon Survey || — || align=right data-sort-value="0.86" | 860 m || 
|-id=230 bgcolor=#fefefe
| 449230 ||  || — || November 11, 2004 || Kitt Peak || Spacewatch || NYS || align=right data-sort-value="0.60" | 600 m || 
|-id=231 bgcolor=#E9E9E9
| 449231 ||  || — || October 15, 2007 || Mount Lemmon || Mount Lemmon Survey || — || align=right | 1.4 km || 
|-id=232 bgcolor=#E9E9E9
| 449232 ||  || — || January 31, 2004 || Catalina || CSS || — || align=right | 3.6 km || 
|-id=233 bgcolor=#E9E9E9
| 449233 ||  || — || June 7, 2010 || WISE || WISE || DOR || align=right | 2.9 km || 
|-id=234 bgcolor=#fefefe
| 449234 ||  || — || September 11, 2007 || Mount Lemmon || Mount Lemmon Survey || V || align=right data-sort-value="0.80" | 800 m || 
|-id=235 bgcolor=#fefefe
| 449235 ||  || — || February 4, 2006 || Mount Lemmon || Mount Lemmon Survey || — || align=right data-sort-value="0.98" | 980 m || 
|-id=236 bgcolor=#E9E9E9
| 449236 ||  || — || September 19, 2006 || Kitt Peak || Spacewatch || AGN || align=right | 1.2 km || 
|-id=237 bgcolor=#E9E9E9
| 449237 ||  || — || March 14, 2004 || Kitt Peak || Spacewatch || — || align=right | 2.9 km || 
|-id=238 bgcolor=#fefefe
| 449238 ||  || — || May 21, 2006 || Kitt Peak || Spacewatch || NYS || align=right data-sort-value="0.66" | 660 m || 
|-id=239 bgcolor=#E9E9E9
| 449239 ||  || — || February 5, 2013 || Kitt Peak || Spacewatch || — || align=right | 2.4 km || 
|-id=240 bgcolor=#E9E9E9
| 449240 ||  || — || September 30, 2006 || Mount Lemmon || Mount Lemmon Survey || — || align=right | 2.3 km || 
|-id=241 bgcolor=#E9E9E9
| 449241 ||  || — || August 27, 2006 || Kitt Peak || Spacewatch || — || align=right | 2.9 km || 
|-id=242 bgcolor=#E9E9E9
| 449242 ||  || — || February 28, 2008 || Kitt Peak || Spacewatch || — || align=right | 2.3 km || 
|-id=243 bgcolor=#fefefe
| 449243 ||  || — || April 2, 2006 || Kitt Peak || Spacewatch || — || align=right data-sort-value="0.96" | 960 m || 
|-id=244 bgcolor=#fefefe
| 449244 ||  || — || May 4, 2006 || Mount Lemmon || Mount Lemmon Survey || NYS || align=right data-sort-value="0.70" | 700 m || 
|-id=245 bgcolor=#E9E9E9
| 449245 ||  || — || December 17, 2003 || Kitt Peak || Spacewatch || — || align=right | 1.5 km || 
|-id=246 bgcolor=#E9E9E9
| 449246 ||  || — || March 19, 2009 || Mount Lemmon || Mount Lemmon Survey || — || align=right | 1.5 km || 
|-id=247 bgcolor=#E9E9E9
| 449247 ||  || — || March 10, 2005 || Mount Lemmon || Mount Lemmon Survey || KON || align=right | 3.3 km || 
|-id=248 bgcolor=#E9E9E9
| 449248 ||  || — || February 2, 2009 || Kitt Peak || Spacewatch || — || align=right data-sort-value="0.96" | 960 m || 
|-id=249 bgcolor=#fefefe
| 449249 ||  || — || December 22, 2008 || Kitt Peak || Spacewatch || — || align=right data-sort-value="0.74" | 740 m || 
|-id=250 bgcolor=#E9E9E9
| 449250 ||  || — || May 27, 2009 || Kitt Peak || Spacewatch || DOR || align=right | 2.3 km || 
|-id=251 bgcolor=#E9E9E9
| 449251 ||  || — || February 20, 2009 || Mount Lemmon || Mount Lemmon Survey || — || align=right | 1.4 km || 
|-id=252 bgcolor=#fefefe
| 449252 ||  || — || October 9, 2004 || Kitt Peak || Spacewatch || — || align=right data-sort-value="0.65" | 650 m || 
|-id=253 bgcolor=#fefefe
| 449253 ||  || — || February 19, 2009 || Kitt Peak || Spacewatch || V || align=right data-sort-value="0.51" | 510 m || 
|-id=254 bgcolor=#E9E9E9
| 449254 ||  || — || September 23, 2006 || Kitt Peak || Spacewatch || EUN || align=right | 1.3 km || 
|-id=255 bgcolor=#fefefe
| 449255 ||  || — || October 10, 1996 || Kitt Peak || Spacewatch || — || align=right data-sort-value="0.88" | 880 m || 
|-id=256 bgcolor=#fefefe
| 449256 ||  || — || May 23, 2006 || Mount Lemmon || Mount Lemmon Survey || V || align=right data-sort-value="0.68" | 680 m || 
|-id=257 bgcolor=#E9E9E9
| 449257 ||  || — || April 11, 2005 || Kitt Peak || Spacewatch || — || align=right | 1.3 km || 
|-id=258 bgcolor=#E9E9E9
| 449258 ||  || — || December 17, 2003 || Socorro || LINEAR || EUN || align=right | 1.7 km || 
|-id=259 bgcolor=#fefefe
| 449259 ||  || — || September 10, 2008 || Siding Spring || SSS || — || align=right | 1.2 km || 
|-id=260 bgcolor=#E9E9E9
| 449260 ||  || — || August 29, 2006 || Kitt Peak || Spacewatch || — || align=right | 1.8 km || 
|-id=261 bgcolor=#E9E9E9
| 449261 ||  || — || February 12, 2004 || Kitt Peak || Spacewatch || — || align=right | 1.4 km || 
|-id=262 bgcolor=#fefefe
| 449262 ||  || — || March 25, 2006 || Kitt Peak || Spacewatch || V || align=right data-sort-value="0.75" | 750 m || 
|-id=263 bgcolor=#E9E9E9
| 449263 ||  || — || March 15, 2004 || Kitt Peak || Spacewatch || AEO || align=right | 1.2 km || 
|-id=264 bgcolor=#E9E9E9
| 449264 ||  || — || February 19, 2009 || Kitt Peak || Spacewatch || — || align=right data-sort-value="0.89" | 890 m || 
|-id=265 bgcolor=#E9E9E9
| 449265 ||  || — || March 31, 2009 || Kitt Peak || Spacewatch || — || align=right | 1.3 km || 
|-id=266 bgcolor=#fefefe
| 449266 ||  || — || December 15, 2004 || Kitt Peak || Spacewatch || — || align=right data-sort-value="0.86" | 860 m || 
|-id=267 bgcolor=#d6d6d6
| 449267 ||  || — || October 31, 2010 || Mount Lemmon || Mount Lemmon Survey || — || align=right | 2.1 km || 
|-id=268 bgcolor=#E9E9E9
| 449268 ||  || — || October 9, 2007 || Kitt Peak || Spacewatch || — || align=right | 1.1 km || 
|-id=269 bgcolor=#fefefe
| 449269 ||  || — || April 21, 2006 || Kitt Peak || Spacewatch || — || align=right data-sort-value="0.88" | 880 m || 
|-id=270 bgcolor=#E9E9E9
| 449270 ||  || — || December 22, 2003 || Kitt Peak || Spacewatch || — || align=right | 1.4 km || 
|-id=271 bgcolor=#E9E9E9
| 449271 ||  || — || June 28, 2005 || Kitt Peak || Spacewatch || — || align=right | 1.4 km || 
|-id=272 bgcolor=#E9E9E9
| 449272 ||  || — || September 25, 1998 || Anderson Mesa || LONEOS || — || align=right | 2.1 km || 
|-id=273 bgcolor=#E9E9E9
| 449273 ||  || — || March 19, 2005 || Siding Spring || SSS || — || align=right | 1.3 km || 
|-id=274 bgcolor=#d6d6d6
| 449274 ||  || — || April 1, 2008 || Mount Lemmon || Mount Lemmon Survey || — || align=right | 2.4 km || 
|-id=275 bgcolor=#fefefe
| 449275 ||  || — || December 20, 2004 || Mount Lemmon || Mount Lemmon Survey || — || align=right data-sort-value="0.62" | 620 m || 
|-id=276 bgcolor=#fefefe
| 449276 ||  || — || September 12, 2007 || Mount Lemmon || Mount Lemmon Survey || NYS || align=right data-sort-value="0.60" | 600 m || 
|-id=277 bgcolor=#fefefe
| 449277 ||  || — || February 8, 1995 || Kitt Peak || Spacewatch || NYS || align=right data-sort-value="0.59" | 590 m || 
|-id=278 bgcolor=#fefefe
| 449278 ||  || — || February 14, 2009 || Mount Lemmon || Mount Lemmon Survey || MAS || align=right data-sort-value="0.54" | 540 m || 
|-id=279 bgcolor=#E9E9E9
| 449279 ||  || — || October 19, 2006 || Kitt Peak || Spacewatch || AGN || align=right data-sort-value="0.96" | 960 m || 
|-id=280 bgcolor=#E9E9E9
| 449280 ||  || — || March 17, 2004 || Kitt Peak || Spacewatch || — || align=right | 1.7 km || 
|-id=281 bgcolor=#E9E9E9
| 449281 ||  || — || November 2, 2007 || Kitt Peak || Spacewatch || (5) || align=right data-sort-value="0.70" | 700 m || 
|-id=282 bgcolor=#d6d6d6
| 449282 ||  || — || November 1, 2010 || Kitt Peak || Spacewatch || — || align=right | 3.2 km || 
|-id=283 bgcolor=#E9E9E9
| 449283 ||  || — || April 21, 2004 || Kitt Peak || Spacewatch || AGN || align=right | 1.1 km || 
|-id=284 bgcolor=#E9E9E9
| 449284 ||  || — || August 29, 2006 || Kitt Peak || Spacewatch || — || align=right | 1.6 km || 
|-id=285 bgcolor=#E9E9E9
| 449285 ||  || — || February 7, 2013 || Kitt Peak || Spacewatch || — || align=right | 2.0 km || 
|-id=286 bgcolor=#E9E9E9
| 449286 ||  || — || November 3, 2007 || Mount Lemmon || Mount Lemmon Survey || — || align=right data-sort-value="0.93" | 930 m || 
|-id=287 bgcolor=#E9E9E9
| 449287 ||  || — || March 19, 2009 || Kitt Peak || Spacewatch || — || align=right | 1.5 km || 
|-id=288 bgcolor=#d6d6d6
| 449288 ||  || — || April 24, 2008 || Kitt Peak || Spacewatch || THM || align=right | 2.1 km || 
|-id=289 bgcolor=#d6d6d6
| 449289 ||  || — || March 30, 2008 || Kitt Peak || Spacewatch || — || align=right | 2.9 km || 
|-id=290 bgcolor=#E9E9E9
| 449290 ||  || — || December 29, 2003 || Catalina || CSS || EUN || align=right | 1.6 km || 
|-id=291 bgcolor=#E9E9E9
| 449291 ||  || — || March 31, 2009 || Kitt Peak || Spacewatch || — || align=right | 1.6 km || 
|-id=292 bgcolor=#E9E9E9
| 449292 ||  || — || December 3, 2007 || Kitt Peak || Spacewatch || JUN || align=right | 1.1 km || 
|-id=293 bgcolor=#d6d6d6
| 449293 ||  || — || February 14, 2013 || Catalina || CSS || — || align=right | 4.0 km || 
|-id=294 bgcolor=#d6d6d6
| 449294 ||  || — || May 2, 2003 || Kitt Peak || Spacewatch || — || align=right | 3.5 km || 
|-id=295 bgcolor=#d6d6d6
| 449295 ||  || — || February 8, 2008 || Kitt Peak || Spacewatch || KOR || align=right | 1.3 km || 
|-id=296 bgcolor=#E9E9E9
| 449296 ||  || — || September 16, 2006 || Catalina || CSS || — || align=right | 2.4 km || 
|-id=297 bgcolor=#E9E9E9
| 449297 ||  || — || March 31, 2009 || Mount Lemmon || Mount Lemmon Survey || — || align=right | 1.4 km || 
|-id=298 bgcolor=#d6d6d6
| 449298 ||  || — || March 13, 2013 || Kitt Peak || Spacewatch || — || align=right | 3.1 km || 
|-id=299 bgcolor=#E9E9E9
| 449299 ||  || — || January 10, 2008 || Kitt Peak || Spacewatch || — || align=right | 2.0 km || 
|-id=300 bgcolor=#d6d6d6
| 449300 ||  || — || March 13, 2013 || Kitt Peak || Spacewatch || — || align=right | 2.7 km || 
|}

449301–449400 

|-bgcolor=#E9E9E9
| 449301 ||  || — || November 2, 2011 || Kitt Peak || Spacewatch || — || align=right | 2.7 km || 
|-id=302 bgcolor=#d6d6d6
| 449302 ||  || — || October 24, 2005 || Kitt Peak || Spacewatch || — || align=right | 3.8 km || 
|-id=303 bgcolor=#E9E9E9
| 449303 ||  || — || April 5, 2000 || Socorro || LINEAR || MIS || align=right | 2.4 km || 
|-id=304 bgcolor=#d6d6d6
| 449304 ||  || — || January 12, 2002 || Kitt Peak || Spacewatch || KOR || align=right | 1.4 km || 
|-id=305 bgcolor=#d6d6d6
| 449305 ||  || — || April 29, 2008 || Mount Lemmon || Mount Lemmon Survey || — || align=right | 2.4 km || 
|-id=306 bgcolor=#E9E9E9
| 449306 ||  || — || May 13, 2004 || Kitt Peak || Spacewatch || — || align=right | 1.8 km || 
|-id=307 bgcolor=#E9E9E9
| 449307 ||  || — || April 28, 2009 || Catalina || CSS || — || align=right | 1.6 km || 
|-id=308 bgcolor=#E9E9E9
| 449308 ||  || — || September 15, 2006 || Kitt Peak || Spacewatch || — || align=right | 1.8 km || 
|-id=309 bgcolor=#fefefe
| 449309 ||  || — || May 25, 2003 || Anderson Mesa || LONEOS || — || align=right | 1.8 km || 
|-id=310 bgcolor=#E9E9E9
| 449310 ||  || — || November 14, 2007 || Mount Lemmon || Mount Lemmon Survey || — || align=right | 1.9 km || 
|-id=311 bgcolor=#E9E9E9
| 449311 ||  || — || September 26, 2011 || Kitt Peak || Spacewatch || — || align=right data-sort-value="0.98" | 980 m || 
|-id=312 bgcolor=#E9E9E9
| 449312 ||  || — || January 11, 2008 || Kitt Peak || Spacewatch || — || align=right | 2.5 km || 
|-id=313 bgcolor=#E9E9E9
| 449313 ||  || — || April 20, 2009 || Kitt Peak || Spacewatch || — || align=right | 2.1 km || 
|-id=314 bgcolor=#d6d6d6
| 449314 ||  || — || January 10, 2007 || Mount Lemmon || Mount Lemmon Survey || EOS || align=right | 1.8 km || 
|-id=315 bgcolor=#d6d6d6
| 449315 ||  || — || March 3, 2005 || Kitt Peak || Spacewatch || 3:2 || align=right | 4.3 km || 
|-id=316 bgcolor=#d6d6d6
| 449316 ||  || — || April 13, 2008 || Kitt Peak || Spacewatch || — || align=right | 4.2 km || 
|-id=317 bgcolor=#E9E9E9
| 449317 ||  || — || November 23, 2011 || Kitt Peak || Spacewatch || — || align=right | 1.7 km || 
|-id=318 bgcolor=#d6d6d6
| 449318 ||  || — || October 9, 2010 || Mount Lemmon || Mount Lemmon Survey || — || align=right | 1.9 km || 
|-id=319 bgcolor=#fefefe
| 449319 ||  || — || February 1, 2005 || Kitt Peak || Spacewatch || — || align=right data-sort-value="0.89" | 890 m || 
|-id=320 bgcolor=#d6d6d6
| 449320 ||  || — || March 12, 2007 || Kitt Peak || Spacewatch || — || align=right | 2.8 km || 
|-id=321 bgcolor=#fefefe
| 449321 ||  || — || January 15, 2005 || Kitt Peak || Spacewatch || — || align=right data-sort-value="0.96" | 960 m || 
|-id=322 bgcolor=#E9E9E9
| 449322 ||  || — || September 16, 2006 || Kitt Peak || Spacewatch || — || align=right | 3.8 km || 
|-id=323 bgcolor=#d6d6d6
| 449323 ||  || — || October 4, 2005 || Catalina || CSS || EOS || align=right | 2.1 km || 
|-id=324 bgcolor=#E9E9E9
| 449324 ||  || — || April 18, 2009 || Kitt Peak || Spacewatch || WIT || align=right | 1.3 km || 
|-id=325 bgcolor=#d6d6d6
| 449325 ||  || — || October 10, 2010 || Mount Lemmon || Mount Lemmon Survey || — || align=right | 3.4 km || 
|-id=326 bgcolor=#E9E9E9
| 449326 ||  || — || January 20, 2009 || Mount Lemmon || Mount Lemmon Survey || — || align=right | 1.1 km || 
|-id=327 bgcolor=#d6d6d6
| 449327 ||  || — || February 23, 2007 || Catalina || CSS || — || align=right | 3.8 km || 
|-id=328 bgcolor=#d6d6d6
| 449328 ||  || — || March 10, 2008 || Kitt Peak || Spacewatch || — || align=right | 2.0 km || 
|-id=329 bgcolor=#E9E9E9
| 449329 ||  || — || April 18, 2009 || Kitt Peak || Spacewatch || — || align=right | 1.5 km || 
|-id=330 bgcolor=#d6d6d6
| 449330 ||  || — || March 30, 2008 || Kitt Peak || Spacewatch || — || align=right | 2.3 km || 
|-id=331 bgcolor=#d6d6d6
| 449331 ||  || — || March 30, 2008 || Kitt Peak || Spacewatch || — || align=right | 2.5 km || 
|-id=332 bgcolor=#fefefe
| 449332 ||  || — || March 9, 2005 || Mount Lemmon || Mount Lemmon Survey || NYS || align=right data-sort-value="0.63" | 630 m || 
|-id=333 bgcolor=#d6d6d6
| 449333 ||  || — || March 12, 2013 || Kitt Peak || Spacewatch || — || align=right | 2.6 km || 
|-id=334 bgcolor=#d6d6d6
| 449334 ||  || — || February 25, 2007 || Mount Lemmon || Mount Lemmon Survey || HYG || align=right | 2.6 km || 
|-id=335 bgcolor=#d6d6d6
| 449335 ||  || — || March 5, 2008 || Mount Lemmon || Mount Lemmon Survey || — || align=right | 3.2 km || 
|-id=336 bgcolor=#E9E9E9
| 449336 ||  || — || May 6, 2005 || Kitt Peak || Spacewatch || — || align=right | 2.0 km || 
|-id=337 bgcolor=#d6d6d6
| 449337 ||  || — || August 8, 2010 || WISE || WISE || — || align=right | 4.8 km || 
|-id=338 bgcolor=#d6d6d6
| 449338 ||  || — || February 26, 2008 || Mount Lemmon || Mount Lemmon Survey || KOR || align=right | 1.3 km || 
|-id=339 bgcolor=#d6d6d6
| 449339 ||  || — || September 30, 2010 || Mount Lemmon || Mount Lemmon Survey || — || align=right | 2.2 km || 
|-id=340 bgcolor=#d6d6d6
| 449340 ||  || — || April 6, 2008 || Kitt Peak || Spacewatch || — || align=right | 2.7 km || 
|-id=341 bgcolor=#d6d6d6
| 449341 ||  || — || July 27, 2010 || WISE || WISE || — || align=right | 3.4 km || 
|-id=342 bgcolor=#E9E9E9
| 449342 ||  || — || January 31, 2008 || Mount Lemmon || Mount Lemmon Survey || — || align=right | 1.8 km || 
|-id=343 bgcolor=#E9E9E9
| 449343 ||  || — || May 6, 2005 || Kitt Peak || Spacewatch || — || align=right | 1.5 km || 
|-id=344 bgcolor=#E9E9E9
| 449344 ||  || — || January 30, 2009 || Mount Lemmon || Mount Lemmon Survey || — || align=right | 1.3 km || 
|-id=345 bgcolor=#d6d6d6
| 449345 ||  || — || March 11, 2013 || Mount Lemmon || Mount Lemmon Survey || — || align=right | 3.8 km || 
|-id=346 bgcolor=#E9E9E9
| 449346 ||  || — || September 26, 2006 || Catalina || CSS || — || align=right | 4.0 km || 
|-id=347 bgcolor=#d6d6d6
| 449347 ||  || — || May 5, 2008 || Kitt Peak || Spacewatch || — || align=right | 2.8 km || 
|-id=348 bgcolor=#d6d6d6
| 449348 ||  || — || April 11, 2008 || Kitt Peak || Spacewatch || EOS || align=right | 1.9 km || 
|-id=349 bgcolor=#d6d6d6
| 449349 ||  || — || June 1, 2008 || Mount Lemmon || Mount Lemmon Survey || — || align=right | 3.4 km || 
|-id=350 bgcolor=#d6d6d6
| 449350 ||  || — || March 11, 2008 || Mount Lemmon || Mount Lemmon Survey || — || align=right | 2.7 km || 
|-id=351 bgcolor=#E9E9E9
| 449351 ||  || — || September 26, 2011 || Kitt Peak || Spacewatch || — || align=right data-sort-value="0.93" | 930 m || 
|-id=352 bgcolor=#E9E9E9
| 449352 ||  || — || March 21, 2004 || Kitt Peak || Spacewatch || EUN || align=right | 1.2 km || 
|-id=353 bgcolor=#E9E9E9
| 449353 ||  || — || March 26, 2009 || Kitt Peak || Spacewatch || EUN || align=right data-sort-value="0.87" | 870 m || 
|-id=354 bgcolor=#E9E9E9
| 449354 ||  || — || February 16, 2013 || Mount Lemmon || Mount Lemmon Survey || — || align=right | 1.4 km || 
|-id=355 bgcolor=#d6d6d6
| 449355 ||  || — || March 13, 2013 || Kitt Peak || Spacewatch || — || align=right | 3.5 km || 
|-id=356 bgcolor=#d6d6d6
| 449356 ||  || — || April 10, 2013 || Mount Lemmon || Mount Lemmon Survey || EOS || align=right | 1.7 km || 
|-id=357 bgcolor=#d6d6d6
| 449357 ||  || — || May 28, 2008 || Mount Lemmon || Mount Lemmon Survey || — || align=right | 2.9 km || 
|-id=358 bgcolor=#d6d6d6
| 449358 ||  || — || November 27, 2006 || Kitt Peak || Spacewatch || KOR || align=right | 1.6 km || 
|-id=359 bgcolor=#E9E9E9
| 449359 ||  || — || February 7, 2008 || Kitt Peak || Spacewatch || AGN || align=right | 1.2 km || 
|-id=360 bgcolor=#E9E9E9
| 449360 ||  || — || December 19, 2003 || Kitt Peak || Spacewatch || — || align=right | 1.7 km || 
|-id=361 bgcolor=#E9E9E9
| 449361 ||  || — || August 28, 2006 || Kitt Peak || Spacewatch || — || align=right | 1.4 km || 
|-id=362 bgcolor=#d6d6d6
| 449362 ||  || — || November 18, 2006 || Kitt Peak || Spacewatch || KOR || align=right | 1.3 km || 
|-id=363 bgcolor=#E9E9E9
| 449363 ||  || — || May 16, 2009 || Kitt Peak || Spacewatch || — || align=right | 1.4 km || 
|-id=364 bgcolor=#E9E9E9
| 449364 ||  || — || August 19, 2001 || Socorro || LINEAR || — || align=right | 3.9 km || 
|-id=365 bgcolor=#d6d6d6
| 449365 ||  || — || April 13, 2008 || Mount Lemmon || Mount Lemmon Survey || — || align=right | 2.0 km || 
|-id=366 bgcolor=#E9E9E9
| 449366 ||  || — || December 28, 2003 || Socorro || LINEAR || — || align=right | 1.3 km || 
|-id=367 bgcolor=#E9E9E9
| 449367 ||  || — || February 10, 2008 || Kitt Peak || Spacewatch || — || align=right | 1.5 km || 
|-id=368 bgcolor=#d6d6d6
| 449368 ||  || — || March 19, 2007 || Anderson Mesa || LONEOS || — || align=right | 4.3 km || 
|-id=369 bgcolor=#E9E9E9
| 449369 ||  || — || May 13, 2004 || Kitt Peak || Spacewatch || — || align=right | 2.5 km || 
|-id=370 bgcolor=#d6d6d6
| 449370 ||  || — || August 27, 2009 || Kitt Peak || Spacewatch || — || align=right | 2.8 km || 
|-id=371 bgcolor=#d6d6d6
| 449371 ||  || — || February 17, 2001 || Kitt Peak || Spacewatch || — || align=right | 3.5 km || 
|-id=372 bgcolor=#d6d6d6
| 449372 ||  || — || October 28, 2010 || Mount Lemmon || Mount Lemmon Survey || — || align=right | 3.0 km || 
|-id=373 bgcolor=#E9E9E9
| 449373 ||  || — || April 10, 2005 || Mount Lemmon || Mount Lemmon Survey || — || align=right data-sort-value="0.87" | 870 m || 
|-id=374 bgcolor=#d6d6d6
| 449374 ||  || — || March 15, 2013 || Kitt Peak || Spacewatch || — || align=right | 2.8 km || 
|-id=375 bgcolor=#d6d6d6
| 449375 ||  || — || October 27, 2005 || Kitt Peak || Spacewatch || — || align=right | 2.8 km || 
|-id=376 bgcolor=#d6d6d6
| 449376 ||  || — || March 13, 2007 || Mount Lemmon || Mount Lemmon Survey || VER || align=right | 3.0 km || 
|-id=377 bgcolor=#d6d6d6
| 449377 ||  || — || August 27, 2009 || Kitt Peak || Spacewatch || LIX || align=right | 3.5 km || 
|-id=378 bgcolor=#d6d6d6
| 449378 ||  || — || April 8, 2013 || Mount Lemmon || Mount Lemmon Survey || — || align=right | 2.7 km || 
|-id=379 bgcolor=#E9E9E9
| 449379 ||  || — || March 16, 2013 || Kitt Peak || Spacewatch || — || align=right | 2.5 km || 
|-id=380 bgcolor=#d6d6d6
| 449380 ||  || — || October 7, 2004 || Kitt Peak || Spacewatch || URS || align=right | 3.3 km || 
|-id=381 bgcolor=#d6d6d6
| 449381 ||  || — || October 5, 2004 || Kitt Peak || Spacewatch || — || align=right | 3.4 km || 
|-id=382 bgcolor=#d6d6d6
| 449382 ||  || — || February 10, 2008 || Kitt Peak || Spacewatch || — || align=right | 2.2 km || 
|-id=383 bgcolor=#E9E9E9
| 449383 ||  || — || January 18, 2008 || Mount Lemmon || Mount Lemmon Survey || — || align=right | 2.0 km || 
|-id=384 bgcolor=#d6d6d6
| 449384 ||  || — || October 10, 2005 || Kitt Peak || Spacewatch || EOS || align=right | 2.5 km || 
|-id=385 bgcolor=#d6d6d6
| 449385 ||  || — || February 28, 2008 || Kitt Peak || Spacewatch || — || align=right | 2.8 km || 
|-id=386 bgcolor=#E9E9E9
| 449386 ||  || — || September 21, 2001 || Kitt Peak || Spacewatch || AST || align=right | 1.9 km || 
|-id=387 bgcolor=#E9E9E9
| 449387 ||  || — || March 26, 2009 || Kitt Peak || Spacewatch || — || align=right data-sort-value="0.82" | 820 m || 
|-id=388 bgcolor=#d6d6d6
| 449388 ||  || — || October 6, 2004 || Kitt Peak || Spacewatch || — || align=right | 2.9 km || 
|-id=389 bgcolor=#d6d6d6
| 449389 ||  || — || October 29, 1999 || Kitt Peak || Spacewatch || — || align=right | 3.2 km || 
|-id=390 bgcolor=#d6d6d6
| 449390 ||  || — || October 5, 2004 || Kitt Peak || Spacewatch || EOS || align=right | 2.2 km || 
|-id=391 bgcolor=#E9E9E9
| 449391 ||  || — || March 12, 2005 || Mount Lemmon || Mount Lemmon Survey || — || align=right data-sort-value="0.93" | 930 m || 
|-id=392 bgcolor=#d6d6d6
| 449392 ||  || — || November 5, 1999 || Kitt Peak || Spacewatch || — || align=right | 3.3 km || 
|-id=393 bgcolor=#d6d6d6
| 449393 ||  || — || March 12, 2007 || Catalina || CSS || — || align=right | 4.2 km || 
|-id=394 bgcolor=#E9E9E9
| 449394 ||  || — || November 16, 2011 || Kitt Peak || Spacewatch || EUN || align=right | 1.9 km || 
|-id=395 bgcolor=#d6d6d6
| 449395 ||  || — || February 7, 2002 || Kitt Peak || Spacewatch || — || align=right | 2.7 km || 
|-id=396 bgcolor=#E9E9E9
| 449396 ||  || — || September 19, 2006 || Kitt Peak || Spacewatch || — || align=right | 2.0 km || 
|-id=397 bgcolor=#E9E9E9
| 449397 ||  || — || July 12, 2010 || WISE || WISE || HOF || align=right | 2.2 km || 
|-id=398 bgcolor=#E9E9E9
| 449398 ||  || — || November 18, 2011 || Mount Lemmon || Mount Lemmon Survey || — || align=right | 1.5 km || 
|-id=399 bgcolor=#d6d6d6
| 449399 ||  || — || January 6, 2006 || Kitt Peak || Spacewatch || — || align=right | 2.8 km || 
|-id=400 bgcolor=#d6d6d6
| 449400 ||  || — || November 11, 2010 || Mount Lemmon || Mount Lemmon Survey || — || align=right | 3.8 km || 
|}

449401–449500 

|-bgcolor=#d6d6d6
| 449401 ||  || — || August 5, 2010 || WISE || WISE || — || align=right | 2.7 km || 
|-id=402 bgcolor=#E9E9E9
| 449402 ||  || — || September 25, 2006 || Kitt Peak || Spacewatch || — || align=right | 1.8 km || 
|-id=403 bgcolor=#d6d6d6
| 449403 ||  || — || November 6, 2010 || Mount Lemmon || Mount Lemmon Survey || EOS || align=right | 1.8 km || 
|-id=404 bgcolor=#E9E9E9
| 449404 ||  || — || September 30, 2011 || Mount Lemmon || Mount Lemmon Survey || EUN || align=right | 1.2 km || 
|-id=405 bgcolor=#d6d6d6
| 449405 ||  || — || September 10, 2004 || Kitt Peak || Spacewatch || EOS || align=right | 2.1 km || 
|-id=406 bgcolor=#E9E9E9
| 449406 ||  || — || May 28, 2000 || Socorro || LINEAR || — || align=right | 2.4 km || 
|-id=407 bgcolor=#E9E9E9
| 449407 ||  || — || April 17, 2009 || Mount Lemmon || Mount Lemmon Survey || EUN || align=right | 1.1 km || 
|-id=408 bgcolor=#d6d6d6
| 449408 ||  || — || January 3, 2012 || Mount Lemmon || Mount Lemmon Survey || — || align=right | 3.6 km || 
|-id=409 bgcolor=#fefefe
| 449409 ||  || — || September 10, 2007 || Mount Lemmon || Mount Lemmon Survey || — || align=right data-sort-value="0.86" | 860 m || 
|-id=410 bgcolor=#E9E9E9
| 449410 ||  || — || September 20, 2011 || Kitt Peak || Spacewatch || — || align=right | 1.2 km || 
|-id=411 bgcolor=#E9E9E9
| 449411 ||  || — || April 13, 2004 || Kitt Peak || Spacewatch || — || align=right | 1.8 km || 
|-id=412 bgcolor=#d6d6d6
| 449412 ||  || — || March 5, 2013 || Mount Lemmon || Mount Lemmon Survey || — || align=right | 2.3 km || 
|-id=413 bgcolor=#d6d6d6
| 449413 ||  || — || December 29, 2011 || Mount Lemmon || Mount Lemmon Survey || — || align=right | 3.2 km || 
|-id=414 bgcolor=#d6d6d6
| 449414 ||  || — || December 2, 2010 || Mount Lemmon || Mount Lemmon Survey || EOS || align=right | 2.3 km || 
|-id=415 bgcolor=#d6d6d6
| 449415 ||  || — || August 12, 2010 || Kitt Peak || Spacewatch || — || align=right | 2.7 km || 
|-id=416 bgcolor=#E9E9E9
| 449416 ||  || — || December 28, 2003 || Kitt Peak || Spacewatch || — || align=right data-sort-value="0.87" | 870 m || 
|-id=417 bgcolor=#d6d6d6
| 449417 ||  || — || July 27, 2009 || Kitt Peak || Spacewatch || EOS || align=right | 1.9 km || 
|-id=418 bgcolor=#d6d6d6
| 449418 ||  || — || February 21, 2007 || Mount Lemmon || Mount Lemmon Survey || — || align=right | 1.9 km || 
|-id=419 bgcolor=#d6d6d6
| 449419 ||  || — || December 5, 2010 || Mount Lemmon || Mount Lemmon Survey || — || align=right | 2.2 km || 
|-id=420 bgcolor=#d6d6d6
| 449420 ||  || — || July 22, 2010 || WISE || WISE || — || align=right | 4.2 km || 
|-id=421 bgcolor=#d6d6d6
| 449421 ||  || — || September 14, 2009 || Catalina || CSS || — || align=right | 3.0 km || 
|-id=422 bgcolor=#E9E9E9
| 449422 ||  || — || February 29, 2004 || Kitt Peak || Spacewatch || — || align=right | 1.7 km || 
|-id=423 bgcolor=#d6d6d6
| 449423 ||  || — || October 25, 2005 || Kitt Peak || Spacewatch || — || align=right | 2.4 km || 
|-id=424 bgcolor=#d6d6d6
| 449424 ||  || — || October 3, 1999 || Kitt Peak || Spacewatch || EOS || align=right | 1.9 km || 
|-id=425 bgcolor=#d6d6d6
| 449425 ||  || — || May 14, 2008 || Mount Lemmon || Mount Lemmon Survey ||  || align=right | 3.0 km || 
|-id=426 bgcolor=#d6d6d6
| 449426 ||  || — || March 8, 2008 || Kitt Peak || Spacewatch || — || align=right | 2.2 km || 
|-id=427 bgcolor=#d6d6d6
| 449427 ||  || — || September 17, 2009 || Mount Lemmon || Mount Lemmon Survey || VER || align=right | 2.2 km || 
|-id=428 bgcolor=#d6d6d6
| 449428 ||  || — || January 19, 2012 || Kitt Peak || Spacewatch || — || align=right | 2.3 km || 
|-id=429 bgcolor=#d6d6d6
| 449429 ||  || — || September 13, 2005 || Kitt Peak || Spacewatch || KOR || align=right data-sort-value="0.98" | 980 m || 
|-id=430 bgcolor=#d6d6d6
| 449430 ||  || — || October 4, 2004 || Kitt Peak || Spacewatch || THM || align=right | 2.1 km || 
|-id=431 bgcolor=#d6d6d6
| 449431 ||  || — || October 28, 2010 || Mount Lemmon || Mount Lemmon Survey || — || align=right | 2.5 km || 
|-id=432 bgcolor=#d6d6d6
| 449432 ||  || — || February 9, 2007 || Kitt Peak || Spacewatch || — || align=right | 2.3 km || 
|-id=433 bgcolor=#d6d6d6
| 449433 ||  || — || March 12, 2007 || Kitt Peak || Spacewatch || — || align=right | 2.2 km || 
|-id=434 bgcolor=#d6d6d6
| 449434 ||  || — || October 17, 2010 || Mount Lemmon || Mount Lemmon Survey || — || align=right | 1.6 km || 
|-id=435 bgcolor=#d6d6d6
| 449435 ||  || — || October 2, 2005 || Mount Lemmon || Mount Lemmon Survey || KOR || align=right data-sort-value="0.93" | 930 m || 
|-id=436 bgcolor=#d6d6d6
| 449436 ||  || — || November 3, 2010 || Mount Lemmon || Mount Lemmon Survey || — || align=right | 2.1 km || 
|-id=437 bgcolor=#d6d6d6
| 449437 ||  || — || December 24, 2005 || Kitt Peak || Spacewatch || — || align=right | 2.0 km || 
|-id=438 bgcolor=#d6d6d6
| 449438 ||  || — || October 31, 2010 || Mount Lemmon || Mount Lemmon Survey || — || align=right | 2.0 km || 
|-id=439 bgcolor=#E9E9E9
| 449439 ||  || — || August 18, 2006 || Kitt Peak || Spacewatch || — || align=right | 1.5 km || 
|-id=440 bgcolor=#E9E9E9
| 449440 ||  || — || November 14, 2006 || Kitt Peak || Spacewatch || — || align=right | 1.8 km || 
|-id=441 bgcolor=#d6d6d6
| 449441 ||  || — || September 29, 2005 || Mount Lemmon || Mount Lemmon Survey || — || align=right | 1.8 km || 
|-id=442 bgcolor=#E9E9E9
| 449442 ||  || — || December 6, 2002 || Socorro || LINEAR || — || align=right | 1.3 km || 
|-id=443 bgcolor=#E9E9E9
| 449443 ||  || — || January 13, 2008 || Mount Lemmon || Mount Lemmon Survey || — || align=right | 1.2 km || 
|-id=444 bgcolor=#d6d6d6
| 449444 ||  || — || October 2, 2010 || Mount Lemmon || Mount Lemmon Survey || — || align=right | 4.7 km || 
|-id=445 bgcolor=#E9E9E9
| 449445 ||  || — || January 10, 2008 || Kitt Peak || Spacewatch || — || align=right | 1.6 km || 
|-id=446 bgcolor=#d6d6d6
| 449446 ||  || — || February 21, 2007 || Mount Lemmon || Mount Lemmon Survey || EOS || align=right | 1.6 km || 
|-id=447 bgcolor=#d6d6d6
| 449447 ||  || — || January 8, 2010 || WISE || WISE || — || align=right | 3.5 km || 
|-id=448 bgcolor=#d6d6d6
| 449448 ||  || — || October 7, 2004 || Kitt Peak || Spacewatch || — || align=right | 3.7 km || 
|-id=449 bgcolor=#d6d6d6
| 449449 ||  || — || May 11, 2013 || Mount Lemmon || Mount Lemmon Survey || VER || align=right | 2.5 km || 
|-id=450 bgcolor=#d6d6d6
| 449450 ||  || — || April 25, 2007 || Mount Lemmon || Mount Lemmon Survey || — || align=right | 3.3 km || 
|-id=451 bgcolor=#d6d6d6
| 449451 ||  || — || December 8, 2010 || Kitt Peak || Spacewatch || — || align=right | 3.8 km || 
|-id=452 bgcolor=#d6d6d6
| 449452 ||  || — || October 24, 2005 || Kitt Peak || Spacewatch || — || align=right | 2.9 km || 
|-id=453 bgcolor=#d6d6d6
| 449453 ||  || — || January 31, 2006 || Kitt Peak || Spacewatch || VER || align=right | 2.9 km || 
|-id=454 bgcolor=#E9E9E9
| 449454 ||  || — || May 15, 2009 || Mount Lemmon || Mount Lemmon Survey || — || align=right | 4.5 km || 
|-id=455 bgcolor=#d6d6d6
| 449455 ||  || — || November 11, 2010 || Mount Lemmon || Mount Lemmon Survey || — || align=right | 2.2 km || 
|-id=456 bgcolor=#d6d6d6
| 449456 ||  || — || March 18, 2013 || Mount Lemmon || Mount Lemmon Survey || — || align=right | 3.5 km || 
|-id=457 bgcolor=#d6d6d6
| 449457 ||  || — || November 9, 1999 || Kitt Peak || Spacewatch || — || align=right | 3.5 km || 
|-id=458 bgcolor=#d6d6d6
| 449458 ||  || — || May 31, 2013 || Kitt Peak || Spacewatch || — || align=right | 3.4 km || 
|-id=459 bgcolor=#d6d6d6
| 449459 ||  || — || November 10, 2004 || Kitt Peak || Spacewatch || — || align=right | 4.1 km || 
|-id=460 bgcolor=#d6d6d6
| 449460 ||  || — || May 14, 2008 || Mount Lemmon || Mount Lemmon Survey || — || align=right | 3.0 km || 
|-id=461 bgcolor=#d6d6d6
| 449461 ||  || — || September 15, 2009 || Kitt Peak || Spacewatch || EOS || align=right | 1.9 km || 
|-id=462 bgcolor=#d6d6d6
| 449462 ||  || — || November 13, 2010 || Mount Lemmon || Mount Lemmon Survey || — || align=right | 3.2 km || 
|-id=463 bgcolor=#d6d6d6
| 449463 ||  || — || February 9, 2010 || WISE || WISE || 7:4 || align=right | 4.4 km || 
|-id=464 bgcolor=#d6d6d6
| 449464 ||  || — || November 4, 2004 || Kitt Peak || Spacewatch || — || align=right | 3.2 km || 
|-id=465 bgcolor=#FA8072
| 449465 ||  || — || November 24, 2003 || Kitt Peak || Spacewatch || — || align=right data-sort-value="0.74" | 740 m || 
|-id=466 bgcolor=#d6d6d6
| 449466 ||  || — || February 17, 2007 || Kitt Peak || Spacewatch || EOS || align=right | 1.8 km || 
|-id=467 bgcolor=#fefefe
| 449467 ||  || — || January 14, 2011 || Mount Lemmon || Mount Lemmon Survey || — || align=right data-sort-value="0.84" | 840 m || 
|-id=468 bgcolor=#fefefe
| 449468 ||  || — || September 7, 1999 || Socorro || LINEAR || H || align=right data-sort-value="0.77" | 770 m || 
|-id=469 bgcolor=#fefefe
| 449469 ||  || — || March 23, 2004 || Socorro || LINEAR || H || align=right data-sort-value="0.54" | 540 m || 
|-id=470 bgcolor=#E9E9E9
| 449470 ||  || — || April 3, 2010 || WISE || WISE || — || align=right | 3.4 km || 
|-id=471 bgcolor=#fefefe
| 449471 ||  || — || April 11, 2005 || Kitt Peak || Spacewatch || — || align=right data-sort-value="0.58" | 580 m || 
|-id=472 bgcolor=#fefefe
| 449472 ||  || — || September 22, 2008 || Kitt Peak || Spacewatch || MAS || align=right data-sort-value="0.73" | 730 m || 
|-id=473 bgcolor=#fefefe
| 449473 ||  || — || November 1, 2005 || Kitt Peak || Spacewatch || — || align=right data-sort-value="0.80" | 800 m || 
|-id=474 bgcolor=#fefefe
| 449474 ||  || — || October 7, 2004 || Kitt Peak || Spacewatch || H || align=right data-sort-value="0.72" | 720 m || 
|-id=475 bgcolor=#fefefe
| 449475 ||  || — || October 29, 2005 || Kitt Peak || Spacewatch || V || align=right data-sort-value="0.60" | 600 m || 
|-id=476 bgcolor=#fefefe
| 449476 ||  || — || January 8, 2010 || Kitt Peak || Spacewatch || MAS || align=right data-sort-value="0.79" | 790 m || 
|-id=477 bgcolor=#fefefe
| 449477 ||  || — || February 21, 2007 || Kitt Peak || Spacewatch || — || align=right data-sort-value="0.69" | 690 m || 
|-id=478 bgcolor=#fefefe
| 449478 ||  || — || May 2, 1997 || Caussols || ODAS || — || align=right data-sort-value="0.70" | 700 m || 
|-id=479 bgcolor=#fefefe
| 449479 ||  || — || May 3, 2003 || Kitt Peak || Spacewatch || NYS || align=right data-sort-value="0.53" | 530 m || 
|-id=480 bgcolor=#fefefe
| 449480 ||  || — || January 12, 2010 || Catalina || CSS || V || align=right data-sort-value="0.68" | 680 m || 
|-id=481 bgcolor=#fefefe
| 449481 ||  || — || September 12, 2007 || Mount Lemmon || Mount Lemmon Survey || H || align=right data-sort-value="0.67" | 670 m || 
|-id=482 bgcolor=#E9E9E9
| 449482 ||  || — || August 19, 2006 || Anderson Mesa || LONEOS || (1547) || align=right | 1.7 km || 
|-id=483 bgcolor=#fefefe
| 449483 ||  || — || April 27, 2000 || Socorro || LINEAR || H || align=right data-sort-value="0.75" | 750 m || 
|-id=484 bgcolor=#fefefe
| 449484 ||  || — || March 12, 2007 || Kitt Peak || Spacewatch || — || align=right data-sort-value="0.81" | 810 m || 
|-id=485 bgcolor=#E9E9E9
| 449485 ||  || — || March 24, 2006 || Mount Lemmon || Mount Lemmon Survey || EUN || align=right | 1.1 km || 
|-id=486 bgcolor=#fefefe
| 449486 ||  || — || June 26, 2004 || Catalina || CSS || — || align=right data-sort-value="0.85" | 850 m || 
|-id=487 bgcolor=#fefefe
| 449487 ||  || — || March 16, 2007 || Kitt Peak || Spacewatch || — || align=right data-sort-value="0.86" | 860 m || 
|-id=488 bgcolor=#fefefe
| 449488 ||  || — || April 17, 2009 || Catalina || CSS || H || align=right data-sort-value="0.58" | 580 m || 
|-id=489 bgcolor=#E9E9E9
| 449489 ||  || — || March 13, 2010 || Mount Lemmon || Mount Lemmon Survey || EUN || align=right | 1.5 km || 
|-id=490 bgcolor=#E9E9E9
| 449490 ||  || — || April 2, 2005 || Mount Lemmon || Mount Lemmon Survey || — || align=right | 2.5 km || 
|-id=491 bgcolor=#fefefe
| 449491 ||  || — || February 28, 2006 || Mount Lemmon || Mount Lemmon Survey || — || align=right | 1.7 km || 
|-id=492 bgcolor=#E9E9E9
| 449492 ||  || — || September 20, 2011 || Kitt Peak || Spacewatch || — || align=right | 2.2 km || 
|-id=493 bgcolor=#fefefe
| 449493 ||  || — || October 14, 2007 || Socorro || LINEAR || H || align=right data-sort-value="0.71" | 710 m || 
|-id=494 bgcolor=#E9E9E9
| 449494 ||  || — || May 19, 2010 || Catalina || CSS || — || align=right data-sort-value="0.98" | 980 m || 
|-id=495 bgcolor=#E9E9E9
| 449495 ||  || — || May 11, 2002 || Socorro || LINEAR || — || align=right | 1.3 km || 
|-id=496 bgcolor=#d6d6d6
| 449496 ||  || — || February 11, 2008 || Kitt Peak || Spacewatch || TIR || align=right | 3.4 km || 
|-id=497 bgcolor=#fefefe
| 449497 ||  || — || December 18, 2004 || Mount Lemmon || Mount Lemmon Survey || — || align=right | 1.1 km || 
|-id=498 bgcolor=#fefefe
| 449498 ||  || — || March 10, 2007 || Mount Lemmon || Mount Lemmon Survey || — || align=right data-sort-value="0.70" | 700 m || 
|-id=499 bgcolor=#d6d6d6
| 449499 ||  || — || March 31, 2009 || Mount Lemmon || Mount Lemmon Survey || — || align=right | 2.3 km || 
|-id=500 bgcolor=#fefefe
| 449500 ||  || — || January 22, 2006 || Mount Lemmon || Mount Lemmon Survey || MAS || align=right data-sort-value="0.72" | 720 m || 
|}

449501–449600 

|-bgcolor=#E9E9E9
| 449501 ||  || — || October 18, 2007 || Kitt Peak || Spacewatch || — || align=right | 2.6 km || 
|-id=502 bgcolor=#E9E9E9
| 449502 ||  || — || March 15, 2010 || Mount Lemmon || Mount Lemmon Survey || — || align=right data-sort-value="0.91" | 910 m || 
|-id=503 bgcolor=#fefefe
| 449503 ||  || — || May 22, 2011 || Mount Lemmon || Mount Lemmon Survey || — || align=right data-sort-value="0.63" | 630 m || 
|-id=504 bgcolor=#fefefe
| 449504 ||  || — || October 26, 2008 || Kitt Peak || Spacewatch || — || align=right | 1.0 km || 
|-id=505 bgcolor=#fefefe
| 449505 ||  || — || March 24, 2003 || Kitt Peak || Spacewatch || MAS || align=right data-sort-value="0.62" | 620 m || 
|-id=506 bgcolor=#fefefe
| 449506 ||  || — || June 16, 2005 || Mount Lemmon || Mount Lemmon Survey || — || align=right data-sort-value="0.56" | 560 m || 
|-id=507 bgcolor=#fefefe
| 449507 ||  || — || March 18, 2010 || Mount Lemmon || Mount Lemmon Survey || — || align=right data-sort-value="0.80" | 800 m || 
|-id=508 bgcolor=#E9E9E9
| 449508 ||  || — || January 31, 2009 || Kitt Peak || Spacewatch || AEO || align=right | 1.1 km || 
|-id=509 bgcolor=#E9E9E9
| 449509 ||  || — || October 21, 2003 || Kitt Peak || Spacewatch || — || align=right | 1.8 km || 
|-id=510 bgcolor=#fefefe
| 449510 ||  || — || September 7, 2004 || Kitt Peak || Spacewatch || MAS || align=right data-sort-value="0.58" | 580 m || 
|-id=511 bgcolor=#fefefe
| 449511 ||  || — || December 5, 2012 || Mount Lemmon || Mount Lemmon Survey || — || align=right data-sort-value="0.86" | 860 m || 
|-id=512 bgcolor=#fefefe
| 449512 ||  || — || March 12, 2007 || Catalina || CSS || (2076) || align=right data-sort-value="0.86" | 860 m || 
|-id=513 bgcolor=#E9E9E9
| 449513 ||  || — || October 24, 2011 || Mount Lemmon || Mount Lemmon Survey || — || align=right | 1.5 km || 
|-id=514 bgcolor=#d6d6d6
| 449514 ||  || — || February 8, 2008 || Mount Lemmon || Mount Lemmon Survey || — || align=right | 2.2 km || 
|-id=515 bgcolor=#E9E9E9
| 449515 ||  || — || March 19, 2001 || Socorro || LINEAR || — || align=right | 2.2 km || 
|-id=516 bgcolor=#fefefe
| 449516 ||  || — || October 20, 2012 || Mount Lemmon || Mount Lemmon Survey || — || align=right data-sort-value="0.63" | 630 m || 
|-id=517 bgcolor=#fefefe
| 449517 ||  || — || September 20, 2007 || Catalina || CSS || H || align=right data-sort-value="0.67" | 670 m || 
|-id=518 bgcolor=#fefefe
| 449518 ||  || — || June 2, 2003 || Kitt Peak || Spacewatch || H || align=right data-sort-value="0.95" | 950 m || 
|-id=519 bgcolor=#E9E9E9
| 449519 ||  || — || September 30, 2006 || Mount Lemmon || Mount Lemmon Survey || — || align=right | 2.0 km || 
|-id=520 bgcolor=#fefefe
| 449520 ||  || — || February 15, 2010 || Kitt Peak || Spacewatch || — || align=right data-sort-value="0.72" | 720 m || 
|-id=521 bgcolor=#fefefe
| 449521 ||  || — || May 5, 2003 || Kitt Peak || Spacewatch || — || align=right data-sort-value="0.87" | 870 m || 
|-id=522 bgcolor=#E9E9E9
| 449522 ||  || — || October 10, 2007 || Kitt Peak || Spacewatch || — || align=right | 1.4 km || 
|-id=523 bgcolor=#fefefe
| 449523 ||  || — || October 15, 2004 || Mount Lemmon || Mount Lemmon Survey || — || align=right data-sort-value="0.78" | 780 m || 
|-id=524 bgcolor=#fefefe
| 449524 ||  || — || April 10, 2010 || Mount Lemmon || Mount Lemmon Survey || — || align=right data-sort-value="0.86" | 860 m || 
|-id=525 bgcolor=#fefefe
| 449525 ||  || — || February 21, 2007 || Mount Lemmon || Mount Lemmon Survey || — || align=right data-sort-value="0.75" | 750 m || 
|-id=526 bgcolor=#fefefe
| 449526 ||  || — || March 23, 2014 || Kitt Peak || Spacewatch || — || align=right data-sort-value="0.98" | 980 m || 
|-id=527 bgcolor=#d6d6d6
| 449527 ||  || — || April 6, 2014 || Mount Lemmon || Mount Lemmon Survey || — || align=right | 3.3 km || 
|-id=528 bgcolor=#E9E9E9
| 449528 ||  || — || January 2, 2014 || Mount Lemmon || Mount Lemmon Survey || — || align=right | 1.9 km || 
|-id=529 bgcolor=#E9E9E9
| 449529 ||  || — || April 30, 2006 || Kitt Peak || Spacewatch || — || align=right data-sort-value="0.97" | 970 m || 
|-id=530 bgcolor=#E9E9E9
| 449530 ||  || — || November 18, 2011 || Mount Lemmon || Mount Lemmon Survey || — || align=right | 2.1 km || 
|-id=531 bgcolor=#E9E9E9
| 449531 ||  || — || November 18, 2011 || Mount Lemmon || Mount Lemmon Survey || — || align=right | 1.3 km || 
|-id=532 bgcolor=#fefefe
| 449532 ||  || — || November 30, 2005 || Kitt Peak || Spacewatch || — || align=right data-sort-value="0.78" | 780 m || 
|-id=533 bgcolor=#fefefe
| 449533 ||  || — || January 27, 2006 || Kitt Peak || Spacewatch || — || align=right data-sort-value="0.71" | 710 m || 
|-id=534 bgcolor=#E9E9E9
| 449534 ||  || — || February 21, 2009 || Kitt Peak || Spacewatch || — || align=right | 2.2 km || 
|-id=535 bgcolor=#fefefe
| 449535 ||  || — || September 23, 2008 || Kitt Peak || Spacewatch || V || align=right data-sort-value="0.59" | 590 m || 
|-id=536 bgcolor=#fefefe
| 449536 ||  || — || February 1, 2013 || Mount Lemmon || Mount Lemmon Survey || — || align=right data-sort-value="0.90" | 900 m || 
|-id=537 bgcolor=#E9E9E9
| 449537 ||  || — || October 22, 2011 || Mount Lemmon || Mount Lemmon Survey || — || align=right | 2.4 km || 
|-id=538 bgcolor=#E9E9E9
| 449538 ||  || — || October 18, 2011 || Kitt Peak || Spacewatch || — || align=right | 1.4 km || 
|-id=539 bgcolor=#E9E9E9
| 449539 ||  || — || August 24, 2007 || Kitt Peak || Spacewatch || — || align=right | 1.0 km || 
|-id=540 bgcolor=#d6d6d6
| 449540 ||  || — || April 4, 2003 || Kitt Peak || Spacewatch || — || align=right | 2.1 km || 
|-id=541 bgcolor=#E9E9E9
| 449541 ||  || — || March 8, 2005 || Mount Lemmon || Mount Lemmon Survey || — || align=right | 1.4 km || 
|-id=542 bgcolor=#fefefe
| 449542 ||  || — || August 29, 2011 || Siding Spring || SSS || — || align=right data-sort-value="0.79" | 790 m || 
|-id=543 bgcolor=#fefefe
| 449543 ||  || — || September 24, 2008 || Mount Lemmon || Mount Lemmon Survey || — || align=right data-sort-value="0.62" | 620 m || 
|-id=544 bgcolor=#d6d6d6
| 449544 ||  || — || July 29, 2010 || WISE || WISE || — || align=right | 4.0 km || 
|-id=545 bgcolor=#E9E9E9
| 449545 ||  || — || May 5, 2006 || Kitt Peak || Spacewatch || — || align=right | 1.0 km || 
|-id=546 bgcolor=#fefefe
| 449546 ||  || — || May 21, 2004 || Kitt Peak || Spacewatch || — || align=right data-sort-value="0.76" | 760 m || 
|-id=547 bgcolor=#fefefe
| 449547 ||  || — || November 13, 2012 || Kitt Peak || Spacewatch || — || align=right data-sort-value="0.96" | 960 m || 
|-id=548 bgcolor=#d6d6d6
| 449548 ||  || — || February 16, 2013 || Mount Lemmon || Mount Lemmon Survey || — || align=right | 2.3 km || 
|-id=549 bgcolor=#E9E9E9
| 449549 ||  || — || September 27, 2006 || Catalina || CSS || — || align=right | 1.8 km || 
|-id=550 bgcolor=#fefefe
| 449550 ||  || — || March 26, 2003 || Kitt Peak || Spacewatch || — || align=right data-sort-value="0.83" | 830 m || 
|-id=551 bgcolor=#fefefe
| 449551 ||  || — || January 23, 2006 || Mount Lemmon || Mount Lemmon Survey || V || align=right data-sort-value="0.68" | 680 m || 
|-id=552 bgcolor=#fefefe
| 449552 ||  || — || February 7, 2007 || Mount Lemmon || Mount Lemmon Survey || — || align=right data-sort-value="0.71" | 710 m || 
|-id=553 bgcolor=#E9E9E9
| 449553 ||  || — || September 13, 2007 || Mount Lemmon || Mount Lemmon Survey || EUN || align=right | 1.4 km || 
|-id=554 bgcolor=#d6d6d6
| 449554 ||  || — || October 26, 2005 || Kitt Peak || Spacewatch || — || align=right | 2.9 km || 
|-id=555 bgcolor=#fefefe
| 449555 ||  || — || September 24, 2008 || Mount Lemmon || Mount Lemmon Survey || — || align=right data-sort-value="0.79" | 790 m || 
|-id=556 bgcolor=#fefefe
| 449556 ||  || — || March 12, 2010 || Catalina || CSS || — || align=right | 2.0 km || 
|-id=557 bgcolor=#E9E9E9
| 449557 ||  || — || June 21, 2010 || Kitt Peak || Spacewatch || EUN || align=right data-sort-value="0.97" | 970 m || 
|-id=558 bgcolor=#E9E9E9
| 449558 ||  || — || October 12, 2007 || Mount Lemmon || Mount Lemmon Survey || — || align=right | 1.00 km || 
|-id=559 bgcolor=#fefefe
| 449559 ||  || — || March 16, 2007 || Mount Lemmon || Mount Lemmon Survey || V || align=right data-sort-value="0.64" | 640 m || 
|-id=560 bgcolor=#fefefe
| 449560 ||  || — || June 21, 2007 || Mount Lemmon || Mount Lemmon Survey || — || align=right data-sort-value="0.71" | 710 m || 
|-id=561 bgcolor=#fefefe
| 449561 ||  || — || January 10, 2007 || Kitt Peak || Spacewatch || — || align=right data-sort-value="0.65" | 650 m || 
|-id=562 bgcolor=#fefefe
| 449562 ||  || — || September 23, 2011 || Mount Lemmon || Mount Lemmon Survey || — || align=right data-sort-value="0.75" | 750 m || 
|-id=563 bgcolor=#d6d6d6
| 449563 ||  || — || October 25, 2005 || Mount Lemmon || Mount Lemmon Survey || — || align=right | 3.1 km || 
|-id=564 bgcolor=#E9E9E9
| 449564 ||  || — || November 2, 2011 || Mount Lemmon || Mount Lemmon Survey || — || align=right | 1.9 km || 
|-id=565 bgcolor=#E9E9E9
| 449565 ||  || — || September 28, 2003 || Kitt Peak || Spacewatch || — || align=right data-sort-value="0.98" | 980 m || 
|-id=566 bgcolor=#fefefe
| 449566 ||  || — || March 16, 2007 || Mount Lemmon || Mount Lemmon Survey || — || align=right | 1.6 km || 
|-id=567 bgcolor=#fefefe
| 449567 ||  || — || October 9, 2008 || Mount Lemmon || Mount Lemmon Survey || V || align=right data-sort-value="0.54" | 540 m || 
|-id=568 bgcolor=#E9E9E9
| 449568 ||  || — || August 29, 2006 || Kitt Peak || Spacewatch || — || align=right | 1.5 km || 
|-id=569 bgcolor=#E9E9E9
| 449569 ||  || — || April 15, 2005 || Kitt Peak || Spacewatch || — || align=right | 1.5 km || 
|-id=570 bgcolor=#fefefe
| 449570 ||  || — || March 3, 2006 || Kitt Peak || Spacewatch || — || align=right data-sort-value="0.91" | 910 m || 
|-id=571 bgcolor=#d6d6d6
| 449571 ||  || — || April 15, 2008 || Mount Lemmon || Mount Lemmon Survey || — || align=right | 3.0 km || 
|-id=572 bgcolor=#fefefe
| 449572 ||  || — || May 10, 2007 || Mount Lemmon || Mount Lemmon Survey || V || align=right data-sort-value="0.56" | 560 m || 
|-id=573 bgcolor=#fefefe
| 449573 ||  || — || March 13, 2007 || Mount Lemmon || Mount Lemmon Survey || — || align=right data-sort-value="0.71" | 710 m || 
|-id=574 bgcolor=#fefefe
| 449574 ||  || — || February 22, 2014 || Mount Lemmon || Mount Lemmon Survey || — || align=right data-sort-value="0.78" | 780 m || 
|-id=575 bgcolor=#fefefe
| 449575 ||  || — || January 26, 2006 || Mount Lemmon || Mount Lemmon Survey || NYS || align=right data-sort-value="0.71" | 710 m || 
|-id=576 bgcolor=#E9E9E9
| 449576 ||  || — || October 11, 2007 || Kitt Peak || Spacewatch || — || align=right | 1.0 km || 
|-id=577 bgcolor=#E9E9E9
| 449577 ||  || — || November 1, 2011 || Mount Lemmon || Mount Lemmon Survey || — || align=right | 2.1 km || 
|-id=578 bgcolor=#E9E9E9
| 449578 ||  || — || March 3, 2009 || Kitt Peak || Spacewatch || EUN || align=right | 1.2 km || 
|-id=579 bgcolor=#d6d6d6
| 449579 ||  || — || March 11, 2008 || Kitt Peak || Spacewatch || — || align=right | 2.5 km || 
|-id=580 bgcolor=#d6d6d6
| 449580 ||  || — || February 1, 2013 || Mount Lemmon || Mount Lemmon Survey || — || align=right | 3.7 km || 
|-id=581 bgcolor=#d6d6d6
| 449581 ||  || — || April 7, 2008 || Mount Lemmon || Mount Lemmon Survey || — || align=right | 3.6 km || 
|-id=582 bgcolor=#fefefe
| 449582 ||  || — || May 19, 2004 || Kitt Peak || Spacewatch || — || align=right data-sort-value="0.86" | 860 m || 
|-id=583 bgcolor=#fefefe
| 449583 ||  || — || March 16, 2004 || Kitt Peak || Spacewatch || — || align=right data-sort-value="0.86" | 860 m || 
|-id=584 bgcolor=#fefefe
| 449584 ||  || — || September 4, 2008 || Kitt Peak || Spacewatch || V || align=right data-sort-value="0.60" | 600 m || 
|-id=585 bgcolor=#E9E9E9
| 449585 ||  || — || October 19, 2011 || Mount Lemmon || Mount Lemmon Survey || — || align=right | 1.5 km || 
|-id=586 bgcolor=#E9E9E9
| 449586 ||  || — || November 20, 2001 || Socorro || LINEAR || — || align=right | 2.1 km || 
|-id=587 bgcolor=#fefefe
| 449587 ||  || — || January 22, 2006 || Mount Lemmon || Mount Lemmon Survey || — || align=right data-sort-value="0.74" | 740 m || 
|-id=588 bgcolor=#fefefe
| 449588 ||  || — || September 3, 2008 || Kitt Peak || Spacewatch || — || align=right data-sort-value="0.72" | 720 m || 
|-id=589 bgcolor=#fefefe
| 449589 ||  || — || April 11, 2003 || Kitt Peak || Spacewatch || V || align=right data-sort-value="0.67" | 670 m || 
|-id=590 bgcolor=#E9E9E9
| 449590 ||  || — || May 11, 2010 || Mount Lemmon || Mount Lemmon Survey || — || align=right data-sort-value="0.98" | 980 m || 
|-id=591 bgcolor=#E9E9E9
| 449591 ||  || — || October 11, 2007 || Kitt Peak || Spacewatch || KON || align=right | 2.7 km || 
|-id=592 bgcolor=#d6d6d6
| 449592 ||  || — || November 10, 2010 || Mount Lemmon || Mount Lemmon Survey || Tj (2.97) || align=right | 3.6 km || 
|-id=593 bgcolor=#d6d6d6
| 449593 ||  || — || February 14, 2013 || Catalina || CSS || EOS || align=right | 2.0 km || 
|-id=594 bgcolor=#fefefe
| 449594 ||  || — || September 29, 2008 || Kitt Peak || Spacewatch || — || align=right data-sort-value="0.80" | 800 m || 
|-id=595 bgcolor=#fefefe
| 449595 ||  || — || November 17, 2009 || Kitt Peak || Spacewatch || — || align=right data-sort-value="0.60" | 600 m || 
|-id=596 bgcolor=#fefefe
| 449596 ||  || — || March 26, 2006 || Mount Lemmon || Mount Lemmon Survey || — || align=right data-sort-value="0.86" | 860 m || 
|-id=597 bgcolor=#d6d6d6
| 449597 ||  || — || May 23, 2003 || Kitt Peak || Spacewatch || — || align=right | 4.5 km || 
|-id=598 bgcolor=#fefefe
| 449598 ||  || — || May 10, 2007 || Mount Lemmon || Mount Lemmon Survey || — || align=right data-sort-value="0.72" | 720 m || 
|-id=599 bgcolor=#E9E9E9
| 449599 ||  || — || October 19, 2007 || Kitt Peak || Spacewatch || (5) || align=right data-sort-value="0.69" | 690 m || 
|-id=600 bgcolor=#E9E9E9
| 449600 ||  || — || January 1, 2008 || Kitt Peak || Spacewatch || WIT || align=right | 1.0 km || 
|}

449601–449700 

|-bgcolor=#E9E9E9
| 449601 ||  || — || October 10, 2007 || Mount Lemmon || Mount Lemmon Survey || — || align=right | 1.1 km || 
|-id=602 bgcolor=#fefefe
| 449602 ||  || — || October 6, 2008 || Kitt Peak || Spacewatch || V || align=right data-sort-value="0.71" | 710 m || 
|-id=603 bgcolor=#fefefe
| 449603 ||  || — || April 24, 2004 || Kitt Peak || Spacewatch || — || align=right data-sort-value="0.77" | 770 m || 
|-id=604 bgcolor=#fefefe
| 449604 ||  || — || January 29, 2009 || Kitt Peak || Spacewatch || — || align=right data-sort-value="0.83" | 830 m || 
|-id=605 bgcolor=#d6d6d6
| 449605 ||  || — || September 12, 1998 || Kitt Peak || Spacewatch || — || align=right | 2.6 km || 
|-id=606 bgcolor=#fefefe
| 449606 ||  || — || April 5, 2010 || Kitt Peak || Spacewatch || — || align=right data-sort-value="0.87" | 870 m || 
|-id=607 bgcolor=#E9E9E9
| 449607 ||  || — || January 29, 2009 || Kitt Peak || Spacewatch || — || align=right | 1.4 km || 
|-id=608 bgcolor=#fefefe
| 449608 ||  || — || January 5, 2006 || Kitt Peak || Spacewatch || — || align=right data-sort-value="0.72" | 720 m || 
|-id=609 bgcolor=#fefefe
| 449609 ||  || — || April 7, 2010 || Kitt Peak || Spacewatch || — || align=right data-sort-value="0.62" | 620 m || 
|-id=610 bgcolor=#fefefe
| 449610 ||  || — || April 5, 2003 || Kitt Peak || Spacewatch || — || align=right data-sort-value="0.71" | 710 m || 
|-id=611 bgcolor=#fefefe
| 449611 ||  || — || November 19, 2008 || Mount Lemmon || Mount Lemmon Survey || NYS || align=right data-sort-value="0.69" | 690 m || 
|-id=612 bgcolor=#fefefe
| 449612 ||  || — || November 21, 2008 || Mount Lemmon || Mount Lemmon Survey || — || align=right | 1.0 km || 
|-id=613 bgcolor=#d6d6d6
| 449613 ||  || — || October 9, 2005 || Kitt Peak || Spacewatch || EOS || align=right | 2.0 km || 
|-id=614 bgcolor=#fefefe
| 449614 ||  || — || April 24, 2001 || Kitt Peak || Spacewatch || — || align=right data-sort-value="0.71" | 710 m || 
|-id=615 bgcolor=#fefefe
| 449615 ||  || — || March 13, 2010 || Kitt Peak || Spacewatch || V || align=right data-sort-value="0.57" | 570 m || 
|-id=616 bgcolor=#E9E9E9
| 449616 ||  || — || September 23, 2011 || Mount Lemmon || Mount Lemmon Survey || EUN || align=right data-sort-value="0.99" | 990 m || 
|-id=617 bgcolor=#E9E9E9
| 449617 ||  || — || September 28, 2006 || Kitt Peak || Spacewatch || — || align=right | 1.7 km || 
|-id=618 bgcolor=#E9E9E9
| 449618 ||  || — || October 22, 2011 || Mount Lemmon || Mount Lemmon Survey || — || align=right | 1.1 km || 
|-id=619 bgcolor=#E9E9E9
| 449619 ||  || — || December 8, 2012 || Kitt Peak || Spacewatch || — || align=right | 1.2 km || 
|-id=620 bgcolor=#d6d6d6
| 449620 ||  || — || March 31, 2008 || Mount Lemmon || Mount Lemmon Survey || LIX || align=right | 3.6 km || 
|-id=621 bgcolor=#d6d6d6
| 449621 ||  || — || January 6, 2013 || Mount Lemmon || Mount Lemmon Survey || — || align=right | 3.2 km || 
|-id=622 bgcolor=#E9E9E9
| 449622 ||  || — || March 3, 2009 || Catalina || CSS || DOR || align=right | 2.2 km || 
|-id=623 bgcolor=#E9E9E9
| 449623 ||  || — || October 2, 2006 || Mount Lemmon || Mount Lemmon Survey || — || align=right | 2.4 km || 
|-id=624 bgcolor=#E9E9E9
| 449624 ||  || — || March 28, 2014 || Mount Lemmon || Mount Lemmon Survey || ADE || align=right | 2.0 km || 
|-id=625 bgcolor=#d6d6d6
| 449625 ||  || — || July 14, 2010 || WISE || WISE || — || align=right | 2.8 km || 
|-id=626 bgcolor=#fefefe
| 449626 ||  || — || May 25, 2007 || Mount Lemmon || Mount Lemmon Survey || — || align=right data-sort-value="0.78" | 780 m || 
|-id=627 bgcolor=#E9E9E9
| 449627 ||  || — || February 24, 2009 || Kitt Peak || Spacewatch || AGNfast? || align=right | 1.6 km || 
|-id=628 bgcolor=#E9E9E9
| 449628 ||  || — || October 21, 2011 || Mount Lemmon || Mount Lemmon Survey || (5) || align=right data-sort-value="0.82" | 820 m || 
|-id=629 bgcolor=#E9E9E9
| 449629 ||  || — || May 19, 2010 || Mount Lemmon || Mount Lemmon Survey || — || align=right data-sort-value="0.85" | 850 m || 
|-id=630 bgcolor=#d6d6d6
| 449630 ||  || — || July 21, 2010 || WISE || WISE || EMA || align=right | 3.9 km || 
|-id=631 bgcolor=#d6d6d6
| 449631 ||  || — || April 30, 2008 || Mount Lemmon || Mount Lemmon Survey || — || align=right | 4.4 km || 
|-id=632 bgcolor=#E9E9E9
| 449632 ||  || — || May 19, 2010 || Mount Lemmon || Mount Lemmon Survey || (5) || align=right data-sort-value="0.74" | 740 m || 
|-id=633 bgcolor=#E9E9E9
| 449633 ||  || — || May 10, 2005 || Kitt Peak || Spacewatch || EUN || align=right | 1.1 km || 
|-id=634 bgcolor=#E9E9E9
| 449634 ||  || — || September 18, 2006 || Kitt Peak || Spacewatch || — || align=right | 2.1 km || 
|-id=635 bgcolor=#d6d6d6
| 449635 ||  || — || May 22, 2014 || Mount Lemmon || Mount Lemmon Survey || — || align=right | 2.2 km || 
|-id=636 bgcolor=#E9E9E9
| 449636 ||  || — || June 13, 1993 || Kitt Peak || Spacewatch || EUN || align=right | 1.2 km || 
|-id=637 bgcolor=#fefefe
| 449637 ||  || — || November 10, 2004 || Kitt Peak || Spacewatch || — || align=right | 1.0 km || 
|-id=638 bgcolor=#fefefe
| 449638 ||  || — || July 15, 2007 || Siding Spring || SSS || — || align=right | 1.3 km || 
|-id=639 bgcolor=#d6d6d6
| 449639 ||  || — || June 9, 2010 || WISE || WISE || — || align=right | 3.3 km || 
|-id=640 bgcolor=#d6d6d6
| 449640 ||  || — || October 6, 2004 || Kitt Peak || Spacewatch || — || align=right | 2.8 km || 
|-id=641 bgcolor=#fefefe
| 449641 ||  || — || September 9, 2004 || Socorro || LINEAR || — || align=right data-sort-value="0.78" | 780 m || 
|-id=642 bgcolor=#d6d6d6
| 449642 ||  || — || November 13, 2010 || Mount Lemmon || Mount Lemmon Survey || — || align=right | 2.7 km || 
|-id=643 bgcolor=#E9E9E9
| 449643 ||  || — || September 30, 2011 || Kitt Peak || Spacewatch || — || align=right | 1.5 km || 
|-id=644 bgcolor=#E9E9E9
| 449644 ||  || — || November 19, 2007 || Kitt Peak || Spacewatch || — || align=right | 1.1 km || 
|-id=645 bgcolor=#d6d6d6
| 449645 ||  || — || January 30, 2008 || Mount Lemmon || Mount Lemmon Survey || 615 || align=right | 1.3 km || 
|-id=646 bgcolor=#E9E9E9
| 449646 ||  || — || December 3, 2008 || Mount Lemmon || Mount Lemmon Survey || — || align=right | 1.9 km || 
|-id=647 bgcolor=#d6d6d6
| 449647 ||  || — || July 19, 2010 || WISE || WISE || — || align=right | 3.7 km || 
|-id=648 bgcolor=#d6d6d6
| 449648 ||  || — || March 31, 2008 || Mount Lemmon || Mount Lemmon Survey || — || align=right | 2.6 km || 
|-id=649 bgcolor=#fefefe
| 449649 ||  || — || March 13, 2007 || Kitt Peak || Spacewatch || — || align=right data-sort-value="0.70" | 700 m || 
|-id=650 bgcolor=#E9E9E9
| 449650 ||  || — || July 9, 2005 || Kitt Peak || Spacewatch || — || align=right | 2.0 km || 
|-id=651 bgcolor=#d6d6d6
| 449651 ||  || — || March 15, 2008 || Mount Lemmon || Mount Lemmon Survey || — || align=right | 2.2 km || 
|-id=652 bgcolor=#E9E9E9
| 449652 ||  || — || February 3, 2009 || Kitt Peak || Spacewatch || — || align=right data-sort-value="0.91" | 910 m || 
|-id=653 bgcolor=#E9E9E9
| 449653 ||  || — || October 19, 1998 || Caussols || ODAS || MAR || align=right data-sort-value="0.97" | 970 m || 
|-id=654 bgcolor=#fefefe
| 449654 ||  || — || December 3, 2008 || Mount Lemmon || Mount Lemmon Survey || — || align=right data-sort-value="0.74" | 740 m || 
|-id=655 bgcolor=#E9E9E9
| 449655 ||  || — || April 6, 2005 || Mount Lemmon || Mount Lemmon Survey || — || align=right | 1.7 km || 
|-id=656 bgcolor=#fefefe
| 449656 ||  || — || November 12, 2005 || Kitt Peak || Spacewatch || — || align=right data-sort-value="0.96" | 960 m || 
|-id=657 bgcolor=#d6d6d6
| 449657 ||  || — || December 7, 2005 || Kitt Peak || Spacewatch || — || align=right | 3.1 km || 
|-id=658 bgcolor=#d6d6d6
| 449658 ||  || — || November 18, 2011 || Mount Lemmon || Mount Lemmon Survey || EOS || align=right | 1.8 km || 
|-id=659 bgcolor=#E9E9E9
| 449659 ||  || — || April 26, 2001 || Kitt Peak || Spacewatch || — || align=right | 1.3 km || 
|-id=660 bgcolor=#fefefe
| 449660 ||  || — || May 22, 2014 || Mount Lemmon || Mount Lemmon Survey || V || align=right data-sort-value="0.65" | 650 m || 
|-id=661 bgcolor=#E9E9E9
| 449661 ||  || — || August 10, 2010 || Kitt Peak || Spacewatch || ADE || align=right | 1.7 km || 
|-id=662 bgcolor=#E9E9E9
| 449662 ||  || — || September 29, 2011 || Mount Lemmon || Mount Lemmon Survey || — || align=right data-sort-value="0.89" | 890 m || 
|-id=663 bgcolor=#fefefe
| 449663 ||  || — || April 20, 2004 || Siding Spring || SSS || — || align=right data-sort-value="0.95" | 950 m || 
|-id=664 bgcolor=#fefefe
| 449664 ||  || — || December 3, 2008 || Mount Lemmon || Mount Lemmon Survey || — || align=right data-sort-value="0.89" | 890 m || 
|-id=665 bgcolor=#fefefe
| 449665 ||  || — || March 24, 2003 || Kitt Peak || Spacewatch || V || align=right data-sort-value="0.73" | 730 m || 
|-id=666 bgcolor=#E9E9E9
| 449666 ||  || — || December 4, 2007 || Kitt Peak || Spacewatch || — || align=right | 1.5 km || 
|-id=667 bgcolor=#E9E9E9
| 449667 ||  || — || May 8, 2005 || Kitt Peak || Spacewatch || — || align=right | 1.5 km || 
|-id=668 bgcolor=#E9E9E9
| 449668 ||  || — || March 11, 2005 || Anderson Mesa || LONEOS || — || align=right | 2.0 km || 
|-id=669 bgcolor=#fefefe
| 449669 ||  || — || December 13, 2004 || Kitt Peak || Spacewatch || H || align=right data-sort-value="0.69" | 690 m || 
|-id=670 bgcolor=#E9E9E9
| 449670 ||  || — || January 19, 2009 || Mount Lemmon || Mount Lemmon Survey || — || align=right | 2.1 km || 
|-id=671 bgcolor=#E9E9E9
| 449671 ||  || — || March 1, 2005 || Catalina || CSS || — || align=right | 1.9 km || 
|-id=672 bgcolor=#fefefe
| 449672 ||  || — || December 28, 2005 || Kitt Peak || Spacewatch || — || align=right | 2.0 km || 
|-id=673 bgcolor=#fefefe
| 449673 ||  || — || January 15, 1996 || Kitt Peak || Spacewatch || — || align=right data-sort-value="0.80" | 800 m || 
|-id=674 bgcolor=#E9E9E9
| 449674 ||  || — || October 30, 2007 || Mount Lemmon || Mount Lemmon Survey || RAF || align=right data-sort-value="0.96" | 960 m || 
|-id=675 bgcolor=#d6d6d6
| 449675 ||  || — || October 29, 2010 || Mount Lemmon || Mount Lemmon Survey || — || align=right | 2.6 km || 
|-id=676 bgcolor=#d6d6d6
| 449676 ||  || — || November 3, 2005 || Mount Lemmon || Mount Lemmon Survey || — || align=right | 3.4 km || 
|-id=677 bgcolor=#d6d6d6
| 449677 ||  || — || May 30, 2014 || Mount Lemmon || Mount Lemmon Survey || — || align=right | 3.7 km || 
|-id=678 bgcolor=#E9E9E9
| 449678 ||  || — || November 18, 2006 || Kitt Peak || Spacewatch || — || align=right | 2.1 km || 
|-id=679 bgcolor=#E9E9E9
| 449679 ||  || — || October 12, 2007 || Mount Lemmon || Mount Lemmon Survey || — || align=right | 1.0 km || 
|-id=680 bgcolor=#fefefe
| 449680 ||  || — || March 16, 2007 || Kitt Peak || Spacewatch || — || align=right | 2.0 km || 
|-id=681 bgcolor=#fefefe
| 449681 ||  || — || January 1, 2003 || Kitt Peak || Spacewatch || — || align=right data-sort-value="0.64" | 640 m || 
|-id=682 bgcolor=#E9E9E9
| 449682 ||  || — || November 12, 2007 || Mount Lemmon || Mount Lemmon Survey || — || align=right data-sort-value="0.90" | 900 m || 
|-id=683 bgcolor=#fefefe
| 449683 ||  || — || June 7, 2007 || Kitt Peak || Spacewatch || — || align=right data-sort-value="0.79" | 790 m || 
|-id=684 bgcolor=#fefefe
| 449684 ||  || — || July 1, 2011 || Mount Lemmon || Mount Lemmon Survey || — || align=right data-sort-value="0.65" | 650 m || 
|-id=685 bgcolor=#E9E9E9
| 449685 ||  || — || December 15, 2007 || Mount Lemmon || Mount Lemmon Survey || MAR || align=right | 1.0 km || 
|-id=686 bgcolor=#fefefe
| 449686 ||  || — || February 6, 2010 || Mount Lemmon || Mount Lemmon Survey || — || align=right data-sort-value="0.67" | 670 m || 
|-id=687 bgcolor=#d6d6d6
| 449687 ||  || — || October 28, 2010 || Mount Lemmon || Mount Lemmon Survey || — || align=right | 3.4 km || 
|-id=688 bgcolor=#fefefe
| 449688 ||  || — || February 27, 2006 || Kitt Peak || Spacewatch || — || align=right data-sort-value="0.81" | 810 m || 
|-id=689 bgcolor=#fefefe
| 449689 ||  || — || September 2, 2008 || Kitt Peak || Spacewatch || V || align=right data-sort-value="0.91" | 910 m || 
|-id=690 bgcolor=#fefefe
| 449690 ||  || — || March 4, 2006 || Kitt Peak || Spacewatch || — || align=right data-sort-value="0.84" | 840 m || 
|-id=691 bgcolor=#E9E9E9
| 449691 ||  || — || January 16, 2013 || Mount Lemmon || Mount Lemmon Survey || — || align=right data-sort-value="0.88" | 880 m || 
|-id=692 bgcolor=#E9E9E9
| 449692 ||  || — || October 22, 2006 || Catalina || CSS || — || align=right | 2.9 km || 
|-id=693 bgcolor=#d6d6d6
| 449693 ||  || — || November 3, 2004 || Kitt Peak || Spacewatch || THB || align=right | 3.0 km || 
|-id=694 bgcolor=#E9E9E9
| 449694 ||  || — || September 13, 2007 || Mount Lemmon || Mount Lemmon Survey || — || align=right data-sort-value="0.89" | 890 m || 
|-id=695 bgcolor=#d6d6d6
| 449695 ||  || — || September 6, 2004 || Socorro || LINEAR || — || align=right | 2.8 km || 
|-id=696 bgcolor=#d6d6d6
| 449696 ||  || — || November 5, 2005 || Kitt Peak || Spacewatch || — || align=right | 3.6 km || 
|-id=697 bgcolor=#E9E9E9
| 449697 ||  || — || April 27, 2001 || Socorro || LINEAR || JUN || align=right | 1.2 km || 
|-id=698 bgcolor=#E9E9E9
| 449698 ||  || — || September 15, 2007 || Mount Lemmon || Mount Lemmon Survey || — || align=right | 1.5 km || 
|-id=699 bgcolor=#fefefe
| 449699 ||  || — || January 5, 2013 || Mount Lemmon || Mount Lemmon Survey || — || align=right data-sort-value="0.85" | 850 m || 
|-id=700 bgcolor=#fefefe
| 449700 ||  || — || December 25, 2005 || Kitt Peak || Spacewatch || — || align=right data-sort-value="0.93" | 930 m || 
|}

449701–449800 

|-bgcolor=#E9E9E9
| 449701 ||  || — || September 17, 2010 || Mount Lemmon || Mount Lemmon Survey || — || align=right | 2.5 km || 
|-id=702 bgcolor=#fefefe
| 449702 ||  || — || January 26, 2006 || Kitt Peak || Spacewatch || — || align=right data-sort-value="0.73" | 730 m || 
|-id=703 bgcolor=#E9E9E9
| 449703 ||  || — || March 4, 2005 || Kitt Peak || Spacewatch || — || align=right | 1.4 km || 
|-id=704 bgcolor=#d6d6d6
| 449704 ||  || — || May 26, 2008 || Kitt Peak || Spacewatch || — || align=right | 2.5 km || 
|-id=705 bgcolor=#E9E9E9
| 449705 ||  || — || October 15, 2007 || Mount Lemmon || Mount Lemmon Survey || — || align=right | 2.6 km || 
|-id=706 bgcolor=#E9E9E9
| 449706 ||  || — || April 10, 2005 || Mount Lemmon || Mount Lemmon Survey || JUN || align=right | 1.2 km || 
|-id=707 bgcolor=#E9E9E9
| 449707 ||  || — || March 2, 2008 || Mount Lemmon || Mount Lemmon Survey || — || align=right | 2.5 km || 
|-id=708 bgcolor=#d6d6d6
| 449708 ||  || — || March 21, 2012 || Catalina || CSS || — || align=right | 3.5 km || 
|-id=709 bgcolor=#d6d6d6
| 449709 ||  || — || July 29, 2010 || WISE || WISE || — || align=right | 3.6 km || 
|-id=710 bgcolor=#E9E9E9
| 449710 ||  || — || June 14, 2010 || Mount Lemmon || Mount Lemmon Survey || — || align=right | 1.5 km || 
|-id=711 bgcolor=#d6d6d6
| 449711 ||  || — || January 2, 2006 || Mount Lemmon || Mount Lemmon Survey || — || align=right | 3.6 km || 
|-id=712 bgcolor=#d6d6d6
| 449712 ||  || — || March 25, 2007 || Mount Lemmon || Mount Lemmon Survey || — || align=right | 4.1 km || 
|-id=713 bgcolor=#d6d6d6
| 449713 ||  || — || April 18, 2013 || Mount Lemmon || Mount Lemmon Survey || — || align=right | 2.6 km || 
|-id=714 bgcolor=#E9E9E9
| 449714 ||  || — || December 16, 2007 || Kitt Peak || Spacewatch || — || align=right | 2.0 km || 
|-id=715 bgcolor=#d6d6d6
| 449715 ||  || — || October 30, 2010 || Mount Lemmon || Mount Lemmon Survey || EOS || align=right | 2.0 km || 
|-id=716 bgcolor=#d6d6d6
| 449716 ||  || — || June 1, 2003 || Kitt Peak || Spacewatch || — || align=right | 4.8 km || 
|-id=717 bgcolor=#E9E9E9
| 449717 ||  || — || December 14, 2003 || Kitt Peak || Spacewatch || — || align=right | 2.1 km || 
|-id=718 bgcolor=#d6d6d6
| 449718 ||  || — || October 22, 2009 || Mount Lemmon || Mount Lemmon Survey || 7:4 || align=right | 3.7 km || 
|-id=719 bgcolor=#d6d6d6
| 449719 ||  || — || May 3, 2008 || Kitt Peak || Spacewatch || EOS || align=right | 1.7 km || 
|-id=720 bgcolor=#d6d6d6
| 449720 ||  || — || September 20, 2003 || Kitt Peak || Spacewatch || — || align=right | 3.7 km || 
|-id=721 bgcolor=#d6d6d6
| 449721 ||  || — || July 13, 2010 || WISE || WISE || — || align=right | 2.4 km || 
|-id=722 bgcolor=#E9E9E9
| 449722 ||  || — || March 2, 2009 || Kitt Peak || Spacewatch || — || align=right | 1.7 km || 
|-id=723 bgcolor=#E9E9E9
| 449723 ||  || — || November 30, 2011 || Catalina || CSS || — || align=right | 3.4 km || 
|-id=724 bgcolor=#d6d6d6
| 449724 ||  || — || June 19, 2010 || Kitt Peak || Spacewatch || BRA || align=right | 1.9 km || 
|-id=725 bgcolor=#d6d6d6
| 449725 ||  || — || May 2, 2003 || Kitt Peak || Spacewatch || — || align=right | 2.5 km || 
|-id=726 bgcolor=#d6d6d6
| 449726 ||  || — || October 17, 1998 || Kitt Peak || Spacewatch || — || align=right | 3.7 km || 
|-id=727 bgcolor=#E9E9E9
| 449727 ||  || — || October 2, 2006 || Mount Lemmon || Mount Lemmon Survey || — || align=right | 2.7 km || 
|-id=728 bgcolor=#d6d6d6
| 449728 ||  || — || September 18, 2009 || Catalina || CSS || — || align=right | 4.0 km || 
|-id=729 bgcolor=#d6d6d6
| 449729 ||  || — || June 19, 2004 || Kitt Peak || Spacewatch || — || align=right | 2.7 km || 
|-id=730 bgcolor=#d6d6d6
| 449730 ||  || — || April 8, 2008 || Kitt Peak || Spacewatch || — || align=right | 2.5 km || 
|-id=731 bgcolor=#E9E9E9
| 449731 ||  || — || January 1, 2008 || Kitt Peak || Spacewatch || MAR || align=right | 1.1 km || 
|-id=732 bgcolor=#d6d6d6
| 449732 ||  || — || August 26, 2009 || Catalina || CSS || EOS || align=right | 1.7 km || 
|-id=733 bgcolor=#d6d6d6
| 449733 ||  || — || January 31, 2006 || Mount Lemmon || Mount Lemmon Survey || — || align=right | 3.2 km || 
|-id=734 bgcolor=#d6d6d6
| 449734 ||  || — || June 2, 2014 || Mount Lemmon || Mount Lemmon Survey || — || align=right | 2.1 km || 
|-id=735 bgcolor=#d6d6d6
| 449735 ||  || — || May 28, 2008 || Mount Lemmon || Mount Lemmon Survey || — || align=right | 2.5 km || 
|-id=736 bgcolor=#d6d6d6
| 449736 ||  || — || September 22, 2004 || Anderson Mesa || LONEOS || — || align=right | 4.1 km || 
|-id=737 bgcolor=#d6d6d6
| 449737 ||  || — || September 15, 2009 || Mount Lemmon || Mount Lemmon Survey || — || align=right | 3.2 km || 
|-id=738 bgcolor=#d6d6d6
| 449738 ||  || — || December 12, 1999 || Kitt Peak || Spacewatch || EOS || align=right | 1.9 km || 
|-id=739 bgcolor=#d6d6d6
| 449739 ||  || — || September 19, 2009 || Mount Lemmon || Mount Lemmon Survey || — || align=right | 3.0 km || 
|-id=740 bgcolor=#d6d6d6
| 449740 ||  || — || December 14, 2010 || Mount Lemmon || Mount Lemmon Survey || VER || align=right | 3.3 km || 
|-id=741 bgcolor=#d6d6d6
| 449741 ||  || — || November 27, 2010 || Mount Lemmon || Mount Lemmon Survey || — || align=right | 3.0 km || 
|-id=742 bgcolor=#d6d6d6
| 449742 ||  || — || September 27, 2009 || Mount Lemmon || Mount Lemmon Survey || — || align=right | 3.2 km || 
|-id=743 bgcolor=#d6d6d6
| 449743 ||  || — || October 21, 2009 || Catalina || CSS || — || align=right | 3.6 km || 
|-id=744 bgcolor=#E9E9E9
| 449744 ||  || — || January 16, 2004 || Kitt Peak || Spacewatch || — || align=right | 2.1 km || 
|-id=745 bgcolor=#d6d6d6
| 449745 ||  || — || January 19, 2012 || Kitt Peak || Spacewatch || EOS || align=right | 2.3 km || 
|-id=746 bgcolor=#d6d6d6
| 449746 ||  || — || December 25, 2005 || Kitt Peak || Spacewatch || — || align=right | 4.3 km || 
|-id=747 bgcolor=#d6d6d6
| 449747 ||  || — || January 30, 2012 || Kitt Peak || Spacewatch || — || align=right | 3.1 km || 
|-id=748 bgcolor=#E9E9E9
| 449748 ||  || — || February 28, 2008 || Kitt Peak || Spacewatch || — || align=right | 2.1 km || 
|-id=749 bgcolor=#E9E9E9
| 449749 ||  || — || April 18, 2009 || Kitt Peak || Spacewatch || — || align=right data-sort-value="0.74" | 740 m || 
|-id=750 bgcolor=#d6d6d6
| 449750 ||  || — || January 9, 2007 || Mount Lemmon || Mount Lemmon Survey || 615 || align=right | 1.4 km || 
|-id=751 bgcolor=#E9E9E9
| 449751 ||  || — || December 31, 2011 || Kitt Peak || Spacewatch || — || align=right | 2.3 km || 
|-id=752 bgcolor=#d6d6d6
| 449752 ||  || — || August 16, 2009 || Kitt Peak || Spacewatch || — || align=right | 2.3 km || 
|-id=753 bgcolor=#d6d6d6
| 449753 ||  || — || April 14, 2008 || Mount Lemmon || Mount Lemmon Survey || — || align=right | 2.7 km || 
|-id=754 bgcolor=#E9E9E9
| 449754 ||  || — || June 13, 2005 || Kitt Peak || Spacewatch || — || align=right | 1.5 km || 
|-id=755 bgcolor=#d6d6d6
| 449755 ||  || — || November 30, 2005 || Kitt Peak || Spacewatch || — || align=right | 2.3 km || 
|-id=756 bgcolor=#E9E9E9
| 449756 ||  || — || February 29, 2004 || Kitt Peak || Spacewatch || — || align=right | 1.3 km || 
|-id=757 bgcolor=#E9E9E9
| 449757 ||  || — || September 5, 2010 || Mount Lemmon || Mount Lemmon Survey || — || align=right | 1.5 km || 
|-id=758 bgcolor=#d6d6d6
| 449758 ||  || — || January 21, 2012 || Kitt Peak || Spacewatch || — || align=right | 2.3 km || 
|-id=759 bgcolor=#E9E9E9
| 449759 ||  || — || September 27, 2006 || Mount Lemmon || Mount Lemmon Survey || — || align=right | 2.1 km || 
|-id=760 bgcolor=#d6d6d6
| 449760 ||  || — || December 27, 1999 || Kitt Peak || Spacewatch || — || align=right | 2.9 km || 
|-id=761 bgcolor=#d6d6d6
| 449761 ||  || — || March 30, 2008 || Kitt Peak || Spacewatch || — || align=right | 2.5 km || 
|-id=762 bgcolor=#d6d6d6
| 449762 ||  || — || January 28, 1998 || Kitt Peak || Spacewatch || — || align=right | 2.8 km || 
|-id=763 bgcolor=#d6d6d6
| 449763 ||  || — || January 27, 2007 || Mount Lemmon || Mount Lemmon Survey || — || align=right | 2.1 km || 
|-id=764 bgcolor=#d6d6d6
| 449764 ||  || — || November 7, 2010 || Mount Lemmon || Mount Lemmon Survey || (159) || align=right | 2.7 km || 
|-id=765 bgcolor=#d6d6d6
| 449765 ||  || — || January 2, 2011 || Catalina || CSS || — || align=right | 3.7 km || 
|-id=766 bgcolor=#d6d6d6
| 449766 ||  || — || December 25, 2005 || Kitt Peak || Spacewatch || — || align=right | 2.8 km || 
|-id=767 bgcolor=#E9E9E9
| 449767 ||  || — || June 12, 2010 || WISE || WISE || — || align=right | 1.9 km || 
|-id=768 bgcolor=#d6d6d6
| 449768 ||  || — || December 8, 2005 || Mount Lemmon || Mount Lemmon Survey || EMA || align=right | 3.3 km || 
|-id=769 bgcolor=#d6d6d6
| 449769 ||  || — || May 8, 2008 || Kitt Peak || Spacewatch || — || align=right | 2.4 km || 
|-id=770 bgcolor=#d6d6d6
| 449770 ||  || — || April 11, 2013 || Mount Lemmon || Mount Lemmon Survey || VER || align=right | 2.5 km || 
|-id=771 bgcolor=#d6d6d6
| 449771 ||  || — || September 16, 2003 || Kitt Peak || Spacewatch || — || align=right | 4.1 km || 
|-id=772 bgcolor=#d6d6d6
| 449772 ||  || — || October 29, 2005 || Mount Lemmon || Mount Lemmon Survey || — || align=right | 2.1 km || 
|-id=773 bgcolor=#d6d6d6
| 449773 ||  || — || January 31, 2006 || Kitt Peak || Spacewatch || — || align=right | 2.6 km || 
|-id=774 bgcolor=#d6d6d6
| 449774 ||  || — || September 12, 2004 || Kitt Peak || Spacewatch || EOS || align=right | 2.4 km || 
|-id=775 bgcolor=#d6d6d6
| 449775 ||  || — || December 5, 2010 || Mount Lemmon || Mount Lemmon Survey || — || align=right | 2.8 km || 
|-id=776 bgcolor=#d6d6d6
| 449776 ||  || — || April 14, 2008 || Mount Lemmon || Mount Lemmon Survey || — || align=right | 2.5 km || 
|-id=777 bgcolor=#E9E9E9
| 449777 ||  || — || September 30, 2006 || Mount Lemmon || Mount Lemmon Survey ||  || align=right | 2.1 km || 
|-id=778 bgcolor=#d6d6d6
| 449778 ||  || — || October 15, 2007 || Catalina || CSS || 3:2 || align=right | 4.5 km || 
|-id=779 bgcolor=#d6d6d6
| 449779 ||  || — || January 19, 2012 || Kitt Peak || Spacewatch || — || align=right | 3.4 km || 
|-id=780 bgcolor=#d6d6d6
| 449780 ||  || — || December 29, 2005 || Socorro || LINEAR || EOS || align=right | 1.9 km || 
|-id=781 bgcolor=#E9E9E9
| 449781 ||  || — || March 6, 2008 || Mount Lemmon || Mount Lemmon Survey || — || align=right | 1.9 km || 
|-id=782 bgcolor=#E9E9E9
| 449782 ||  || — || April 12, 2004 || Kitt Peak || Spacewatch || — || align=right | 1.9 km || 
|-id=783 bgcolor=#E9E9E9
| 449783 ||  || — || September 29, 2010 || Mount Lemmon || Mount Lemmon Survey || — || align=right | 1.7 km || 
|-id=784 bgcolor=#d6d6d6
| 449784 ||  || — || December 1, 2005 || Kitt Peak || Spacewatch || — || align=right | 3.7 km || 
|-id=785 bgcolor=#E9E9E9
| 449785 ||  || — || November 15, 2006 || Kitt Peak || Spacewatch || — || align=right | 1.9 km || 
|-id=786 bgcolor=#d6d6d6
| 449786 ||  || — || December 2, 2005 || Mount Lemmon || Mount Lemmon Survey || — || align=right | 2.8 km || 
|-id=787 bgcolor=#d6d6d6
| 449787 ||  || — || November 6, 2010 || Mount Lemmon || Mount Lemmon Survey || — || align=right | 2.8 km || 
|-id=788 bgcolor=#d6d6d6
| 449788 ||  || — || October 8, 2010 || Kitt Peak || Spacewatch || — || align=right | 3.8 km || 
|-id=789 bgcolor=#d6d6d6
| 449789 ||  || — || December 25, 2005 || Kitt Peak || Spacewatch || — || align=right | 2.8 km || 
|-id=790 bgcolor=#d6d6d6
| 449790 ||  || — || December 4, 2005 || Kitt Peak || Spacewatch || — || align=right | 2.4 km || 
|-id=791 bgcolor=#fefefe
| 449791 ||  || — || April 1, 1995 || Kitt Peak || Spacewatch || — || align=right data-sort-value="0.75" | 750 m || 
|-id=792 bgcolor=#d6d6d6
| 449792 ||  || — || November 12, 2010 || Kitt Peak || Spacewatch || — || align=right | 3.6 km || 
|-id=793 bgcolor=#d6d6d6
| 449793 ||  || — || October 28, 2010 || Mount Lemmon || Mount Lemmon Survey || — || align=right | 2.2 km || 
|-id=794 bgcolor=#d6d6d6
| 449794 ||  || — || May 1, 2013 || Mount Lemmon || Mount Lemmon Survey || — || align=right | 3.1 km || 
|-id=795 bgcolor=#E9E9E9
| 449795 ||  || — || September 17, 2006 || Catalina || CSS || — || align=right | 1.8 km || 
|-id=796 bgcolor=#d6d6d6
| 449796 ||  || — || October 4, 2004 || Kitt Peak || Spacewatch || — || align=right | 2.4 km || 
|-id=797 bgcolor=#d6d6d6
| 449797 ||  || — || October 6, 2005 || Mount Lemmon || Mount Lemmon Survey || — || align=right | 2.4 km || 
|-id=798 bgcolor=#d6d6d6
| 449798 ||  || — || February 1, 2012 || Mount Lemmon || Mount Lemmon Survey || — || align=right | 3.4 km || 
|-id=799 bgcolor=#d6d6d6
| 449799 ||  || — || December 25, 2005 || Kitt Peak || Spacewatch || — || align=right | 2.7 km || 
|-id=800 bgcolor=#E9E9E9
| 449800 ||  || — || October 16, 2006 || Catalina || CSS || — || align=right | 2.0 km || 
|}

449801–449900 

|-bgcolor=#d6d6d6
| 449801 ||  || — || December 5, 2010 || Kitt Peak || Spacewatch || — || align=right | 3.5 km || 
|-id=802 bgcolor=#d6d6d6
| 449802 ||  || — || December 10, 2010 || Mount Lemmon || Mount Lemmon Survey || — || align=right | 2.6 km || 
|-id=803 bgcolor=#d6d6d6
| 449803 ||  || — || April 14, 2008 || Mount Lemmon || Mount Lemmon Survey || EOS || align=right | 1.8 km || 
|-id=804 bgcolor=#d6d6d6
| 449804 ||  || — || January 30, 2006 || Kitt Peak || Spacewatch || — || align=right | 2.4 km || 
|-id=805 bgcolor=#d6d6d6
| 449805 ||  || — || September 15, 2004 || Kitt Peak || Spacewatch || — || align=right | 2.3 km || 
|-id=806 bgcolor=#E9E9E9
| 449806 ||  || — || January 26, 2012 || Mount Lemmon || Mount Lemmon Survey || — || align=right | 2.0 km || 
|-id=807 bgcolor=#d6d6d6
| 449807 ||  || — || September 7, 2004 || Kitt Peak || Spacewatch || — || align=right | 2.4 km || 
|-id=808 bgcolor=#E9E9E9
| 449808 ||  || — || February 7, 2008 || Kitt Peak || Spacewatch || — || align=right | 2.4 km || 
|-id=809 bgcolor=#d6d6d6
| 449809 ||  || — || October 22, 1995 || Kitt Peak || Spacewatch || KOR || align=right | 1.2 km || 
|-id=810 bgcolor=#d6d6d6
| 449810 ||  || — || April 26, 2008 || Mount Lemmon || Mount Lemmon Survey || — || align=right | 3.2 km || 
|-id=811 bgcolor=#d6d6d6
| 449811 ||  || — || January 4, 2012 || Mount Lemmon || Mount Lemmon Survey || — || align=right | 2.8 km || 
|-id=812 bgcolor=#d6d6d6
| 449812 ||  || — || November 27, 2010 || Mount Lemmon || Mount Lemmon Survey || — || align=right | 2.3 km || 
|-id=813 bgcolor=#E9E9E9
| 449813 ||  || — || October 13, 2001 || Kitt Peak || Spacewatch || — || align=right | 2.9 km || 
|-id=814 bgcolor=#d6d6d6
| 449814 ||  || — || August 18, 2009 || Kitt Peak || Spacewatch || — || align=right | 2.6 km || 
|-id=815 bgcolor=#d6d6d6
| 449815 ||  || — || February 1, 2006 || Mount Lemmon || Mount Lemmon Survey || VER || align=right | 2.2 km || 
|-id=816 bgcolor=#d6d6d6
| 449816 ||  || — || December 30, 2000 || Kitt Peak || Spacewatch || — || align=right | 2.5 km || 
|-id=817 bgcolor=#d6d6d6
| 449817 ||  || — || October 10, 2010 || Kitt Peak || Spacewatch || — || align=right | 3.7 km || 
|-id=818 bgcolor=#fefefe
| 449818 ||  || — || January 1, 2009 || Kitt Peak || Spacewatch || — || align=right data-sort-value="0.90" | 900 m || 
|-id=819 bgcolor=#d6d6d6
| 449819 ||  || — || December 27, 2005 || Kitt Peak || Spacewatch || — || align=right | 3.2 km || 
|-id=820 bgcolor=#d6d6d6
| 449820 ||  || — || October 22, 2011 || Mount Lemmon || Mount Lemmon Survey || — || align=right | 4.1 km || 
|-id=821 bgcolor=#E9E9E9
| 449821 ||  || — || January 13, 2008 || Mount Lemmon || Mount Lemmon Survey || — || align=right | 1.5 km || 
|-id=822 bgcolor=#d6d6d6
| 449822 ||  || — || December 4, 2005 || Kitt Peak || Spacewatch || EOS || align=right | 2.7 km || 
|-id=823 bgcolor=#d6d6d6
| 449823 ||  || — || October 25, 2005 || Mount Lemmon || Mount Lemmon Survey || KOR || align=right | 1.3 km || 
|-id=824 bgcolor=#d6d6d6
| 449824 ||  || — || January 23, 2006 || Kitt Peak || Spacewatch || — || align=right | 3.3 km || 
|-id=825 bgcolor=#d6d6d6
| 449825 ||  || — || May 28, 2008 || Mount Lemmon || Mount Lemmon Survey || — || align=right | 2.2 km || 
|-id=826 bgcolor=#d6d6d6
| 449826 ||  || — || March 31, 2013 || Mount Lemmon || Mount Lemmon Survey || — || align=right | 3.1 km || 
|-id=827 bgcolor=#d6d6d6
| 449827 ||  || — || October 1, 2003 || Kitt Peak || Spacewatch || — || align=right | 3.2 km || 
|-id=828 bgcolor=#d6d6d6
| 449828 ||  || — || January 15, 2010 || WISE || WISE || — || align=right | 4.0 km || 
|-id=829 bgcolor=#d6d6d6
| 449829 ||  || — || March 26, 2007 || Mount Lemmon || Mount Lemmon Survey || TIR || align=right | 2.7 km || 
|-id=830 bgcolor=#E9E9E9
| 449830 ||  || — || February 28, 2008 || Kitt Peak || Spacewatch || — || align=right | 2.3 km || 
|-id=831 bgcolor=#d6d6d6
| 449831 ||  || — || November 26, 2005 || Mount Lemmon || Mount Lemmon Survey || — || align=right | 2.3 km || 
|-id=832 bgcolor=#d6d6d6
| 449832 ||  || — || September 16, 2009 || Mount Lemmon || Mount Lemmon Survey || EOS || align=right | 2.3 km || 
|-id=833 bgcolor=#d6d6d6
| 449833 ||  || — || October 22, 2005 || Kitt Peak || Spacewatch || — || align=right | 2.1 km || 
|-id=834 bgcolor=#d6d6d6
| 449834 ||  || — || January 21, 2006 || Mount Lemmon || Mount Lemmon Survey || — || align=right | 3.2 km || 
|-id=835 bgcolor=#E9E9E9
| 449835 ||  || — || April 14, 2004 || Kitt Peak || Spacewatch || — || align=right | 2.3 km || 
|-id=836 bgcolor=#d6d6d6
| 449836 ||  || — || November 25, 2005 || Kitt Peak || Spacewatch || KOR || align=right | 1.5 km || 
|-id=837 bgcolor=#d6d6d6
| 449837 ||  || — || May 3, 1997 || Kitt Peak || Spacewatch || — || align=right | 3.3 km || 
|-id=838 bgcolor=#d6d6d6
| 449838 ||  || — || March 14, 2012 || Mount Lemmon || Mount Lemmon Survey || — || align=right | 2.7 km || 
|-id=839 bgcolor=#d6d6d6
| 449839 ||  || — || September 27, 2003 || Kitt Peak || Spacewatch || — || align=right | 2.6 km || 
|-id=840 bgcolor=#d6d6d6
| 449840 ||  || — || January 27, 2007 || Mount Lemmon || Mount Lemmon Survey || EOS || align=right | 1.9 km || 
|-id=841 bgcolor=#d6d6d6
| 449841 ||  || — || March 5, 2006 || Kitt Peak || Spacewatch || — || align=right | 3.1 km || 
|-id=842 bgcolor=#d6d6d6
| 449842 ||  || — || March 21, 2001 || Kitt Peak || Spacewatch || — || align=right | 3.4 km || 
|-id=843 bgcolor=#d6d6d6
| 449843 ||  || — || February 1, 2010 || WISE || WISE || — || align=right | 3.2 km || 
|-id=844 bgcolor=#d6d6d6
| 449844 ||  || — || March 13, 2007 || Kitt Peak || Spacewatch || — || align=right | 2.7 km || 
|-id=845 bgcolor=#d6d6d6
| 449845 ||  || — || May 7, 2007 || Kitt Peak || Spacewatch || (1118) || align=right | 5.7 km || 
|-id=846 bgcolor=#d6d6d6
| 449846 ||  || — || February 25, 2006 || Kitt Peak || Spacewatch || — || align=right | 3.1 km || 
|-id=847 bgcolor=#d6d6d6
| 449847 ||  || — || September 7, 2008 || Mount Lemmon || Mount Lemmon Survey || — || align=right | 3.3 km || 
|-id=848 bgcolor=#d6d6d6
| 449848 ||  || — || September 24, 2009 || Catalina || CSS || — || align=right | 3.8 km || 
|-id=849 bgcolor=#E9E9E9
| 449849 ||  || — || July 9, 2005 || Kitt Peak || Spacewatch || EUN || align=right | 1.8 km || 
|-id=850 bgcolor=#d6d6d6
| 449850 ||  || — || January 30, 2010 || WISE || WISE || — || align=right | 3.7 km || 
|-id=851 bgcolor=#d6d6d6
| 449851 ||  || — || September 17, 2004 || Anderson Mesa || LONEOS || — || align=right | 3.7 km || 
|-id=852 bgcolor=#E9E9E9
| 449852 ||  || — || May 21, 2006 || Kitt Peak || Spacewatch || — || align=right | 1.2 km || 
|-id=853 bgcolor=#E9E9E9
| 449853 ||  || — || October 11, 2007 || Mount Lemmon || Mount Lemmon Survey || — || align=right | 1.5 km || 
|-id=854 bgcolor=#d6d6d6
| 449854 ||  || — || December 30, 2000 || Kitt Peak || Spacewatch || — || align=right | 4.7 km || 
|-id=855 bgcolor=#E9E9E9
| 449855 ||  || — || January 15, 2009 || Kitt Peak || Spacewatch || GEF || align=right | 1.3 km || 
|-id=856 bgcolor=#fefefe
| 449856 ||  || — || September 6, 2008 || Catalina || CSS || NYS || align=right data-sort-value="0.63" | 630 m || 
|-id=857 bgcolor=#fefefe
| 449857 ||  || — || August 25, 2004 || Kitt Peak || Spacewatch || — || align=right data-sort-value="0.75" | 750 m || 
|-id=858 bgcolor=#fefefe
| 449858 ||  || — || June 8, 2008 || Kitt Peak || Spacewatch || V || align=right data-sort-value="0.66" | 660 m || 
|-id=859 bgcolor=#E9E9E9
| 449859 ||  || — || March 6, 2014 || Catalina || CSS || EUN || align=right | 1.6 km || 
|-id=860 bgcolor=#E9E9E9
| 449860 ||  || — || October 17, 2007 || Catalina || CSS || MAR || align=right | 1.1 km || 
|-id=861 bgcolor=#fefefe
| 449861 ||  || — || November 20, 2001 || Socorro || LINEAR || — || align=right data-sort-value="0.85" | 850 m || 
|-id=862 bgcolor=#E9E9E9
| 449862 ||  || — || December 14, 2007 || Mount Lemmon || Mount Lemmon Survey || — || align=right | 2.6 km || 
|-id=863 bgcolor=#E9E9E9
| 449863 ||  || — || September 10, 2007 || Kitt Peak || Spacewatch || KON || align=right | 2.5 km || 
|-id=864 bgcolor=#E9E9E9
| 449864 ||  || — || February 2, 2013 || Mount Lemmon || Mount Lemmon Survey || MAR || align=right | 1.0 km || 
|-id=865 bgcolor=#d6d6d6
| 449865 ||  || — || January 10, 2007 || Mount Lemmon || Mount Lemmon Survey || Tj (2.99) || align=right | 6.6 km || 
|-id=866 bgcolor=#E9E9E9
| 449866 ||  || — || December 4, 2007 || Kitt Peak || Spacewatch || — || align=right | 2.4 km || 
|-id=867 bgcolor=#E9E9E9
| 449867 ||  || — || June 19, 1998 || Kitt Peak || Spacewatch || — || align=right | 1.0 km || 
|-id=868 bgcolor=#E9E9E9
| 449868 ||  || — || September 11, 2007 || Kitt Peak || Spacewatch || — || align=right | 1.3 km || 
|-id=869 bgcolor=#fefefe
| 449869 ||  || — || September 11, 2004 || Socorro || LINEAR || — || align=right | 1.1 km || 
|-id=870 bgcolor=#d6d6d6
| 449870 ||  || — || August 3, 2004 || Siding Spring || SSS || LIX || align=right | 3.6 km || 
|-id=871 bgcolor=#d6d6d6
| 449871 ||  || — || December 13, 2006 || Mount Lemmon || Mount Lemmon Survey || — || align=right | 3.6 km || 
|-id=872 bgcolor=#E9E9E9
| 449872 ||  || — || April 25, 2006 || Kitt Peak || Spacewatch || ADE || align=right | 2.0 km || 
|-id=873 bgcolor=#E9E9E9
| 449873 ||  || — || June 26, 2011 || Mount Lemmon || Mount Lemmon Survey || MAR || align=right | 1.2 km || 
|-id=874 bgcolor=#d6d6d6
| 449874 ||  || — || June 15, 2010 || Mount Lemmon || Mount Lemmon Survey || — || align=right | 2.8 km || 
|-id=875 bgcolor=#E9E9E9
| 449875 ||  || — || April 19, 2006 || Kitt Peak || Spacewatch || — || align=right | 2.4 km || 
|-id=876 bgcolor=#fefefe
| 449876 ||  || — || February 22, 2007 || Kitt Peak || Spacewatch || — || align=right data-sort-value="0.81" | 810 m || 
|-id=877 bgcolor=#fefefe
| 449877 ||  || — || April 27, 2011 || Catalina || CSS || V || align=right data-sort-value="0.80" | 800 m || 
|-id=878 bgcolor=#fefefe
| 449878 ||  || — || February 9, 2010 || Mount Lemmon || Mount Lemmon Survey || — || align=right data-sort-value="0.89" | 890 m || 
|-id=879 bgcolor=#fefefe
| 449879 ||  || — || October 26, 2009 || Mount Lemmon || Mount Lemmon Survey || — || align=right data-sort-value="0.71" | 710 m || 
|-id=880 bgcolor=#d6d6d6
| 449880 ||  || — || May 4, 2009 || Mount Lemmon || Mount Lemmon Survey || — || align=right | 2.2 km || 
|-id=881 bgcolor=#fefefe
| 449881 ||  || — || September 5, 2008 || Kitt Peak || Spacewatch || — || align=right data-sort-value="0.88" | 880 m || 
|-id=882 bgcolor=#d6d6d6
| 449882 ||  || — || June 28, 2005 || Kitt Peak || Spacewatch || — || align=right | 2.6 km || 
|-id=883 bgcolor=#d6d6d6
| 449883 ||  || — || September 18, 2010 || Mount Lemmon || Mount Lemmon Survey || — || align=right | 2.9 km || 
|-id=884 bgcolor=#d6d6d6
| 449884 ||  || — || August 31, 2005 || Kitt Peak || Spacewatch || — || align=right | 2.4 km || 
|-id=885 bgcolor=#fefefe
| 449885 ||  || — || September 2, 2008 || Kitt Peak || Spacewatch || — || align=right data-sort-value="0.71" | 710 m || 
|-id=886 bgcolor=#E9E9E9
| 449886 ||  || — || October 16, 2003 || Kitt Peak || Spacewatch || EUN || align=right | 1.0 km || 
|-id=887 bgcolor=#E9E9E9
| 449887 ||  || — || September 24, 2011 || Mount Lemmon || Mount Lemmon Survey || — || align=right | 1.7 km || 
|-id=888 bgcolor=#E9E9E9
| 449888 ||  || — || April 29, 2006 || Kitt Peak || Spacewatch || MAR || align=right data-sort-value="0.92" | 920 m || 
|-id=889 bgcolor=#E9E9E9
| 449889 ||  || — || August 21, 2006 || Kitt Peak || Spacewatch || — || align=right | 2.7 km || 
|-id=890 bgcolor=#fefefe
| 449890 ||  || — || November 22, 2005 || Kitt Peak || Spacewatch || — || align=right data-sort-value="0.90" | 900 m || 
|-id=891 bgcolor=#d6d6d6
| 449891 ||  || — || April 8, 2008 || Mount Lemmon || Mount Lemmon Survey || — || align=right | 2.8 km || 
|-id=892 bgcolor=#fefefe
| 449892 ||  || — || March 14, 2007 || Mount Lemmon || Mount Lemmon Survey || — || align=right data-sort-value="0.98" | 980 m || 
|-id=893 bgcolor=#fefefe
| 449893 ||  || — || May 6, 2011 || Mount Lemmon || Mount Lemmon Survey || — || align=right data-sort-value="0.73" | 730 m || 
|-id=894 bgcolor=#E9E9E9
| 449894 ||  || — || January 20, 2013 || Kitt Peak || Spacewatch || — || align=right | 2.4 km || 
|-id=895 bgcolor=#fefefe
| 449895 ||  || — || March 13, 2007 || Mount Lemmon || Mount Lemmon Survey || — || align=right data-sort-value="0.65" | 650 m || 
|-id=896 bgcolor=#fefefe
| 449896 ||  || — || September 7, 2004 || Kitt Peak || Spacewatch || — || align=right data-sort-value="0.82" | 820 m || 
|-id=897 bgcolor=#E9E9E9
| 449897 ||  || — || December 15, 2007 || Kitt Peak || Spacewatch || — || align=right | 2.2 km || 
|-id=898 bgcolor=#d6d6d6
| 449898 ||  || — || January 15, 2008 || Mount Lemmon || Mount Lemmon Survey || — || align=right | 2.5 km || 
|-id=899 bgcolor=#d6d6d6
| 449899 ||  || — || February 12, 2004 || Kitt Peak || Spacewatch || — || align=right | 2.8 km || 
|-id=900 bgcolor=#E9E9E9
| 449900 ||  || — || April 9, 2006 || Kitt Peak || Spacewatch || — || align=right | 2.3 km || 
|}

449901–450000 

|-bgcolor=#E9E9E9
| 449901 ||  || — || September 14, 2007 || Mount Lemmon || Mount Lemmon Survey || — || align=right | 1.6 km || 
|-id=902 bgcolor=#E9E9E9
| 449902 ||  || — || November 19, 2008 || Kitt Peak || Spacewatch || — || align=right data-sort-value="0.87" | 870 m || 
|-id=903 bgcolor=#d6d6d6
| 449903 ||  || — || May 16, 2010 || Mount Lemmon || Mount Lemmon Survey || — || align=right | 2.0 km || 
|-id=904 bgcolor=#d6d6d6
| 449904 ||  || — || September 1, 2005 || Kitt Peak || Spacewatch || — || align=right | 2.1 km || 
|-id=905 bgcolor=#fefefe
| 449905 ||  || — || February 17, 2007 || Kitt Peak || Spacewatch || MAS || align=right data-sort-value="0.84" | 840 m || 
|-id=906 bgcolor=#d6d6d6
| 449906 ||  || — || October 28, 2005 || Mount Lemmon || Mount Lemmon Survey || — || align=right | 2.4 km || 
|-id=907 bgcolor=#E9E9E9
| 449907 ||  || — || September 23, 2011 || Kitt Peak || Spacewatch || — || align=right | 2.1 km || 
|-id=908 bgcolor=#d6d6d6
| 449908 ||  || — || November 1, 2005 || Catalina || CSS || EOS || align=right | 3.3 km || 
|-id=909 bgcolor=#fefefe
| 449909 ||  || — || October 7, 2004 || Socorro || LINEAR || — || align=right | 1.3 km || 
|-id=910 bgcolor=#E9E9E9
| 449910 ||  || — || December 16, 2003 || Kitt Peak || Spacewatch || MAR || align=right | 1.1 km || 
|-id=911 bgcolor=#d6d6d6
| 449911 ||  || — || October 12, 2004 || Socorro || LINEAR || — || align=right | 5.2 km || 
|-id=912 bgcolor=#fefefe
| 449912 ||  || — || March 26, 2011 || Mount Lemmon || Mount Lemmon Survey || V || align=right data-sort-value="0.62" | 620 m || 
|-id=913 bgcolor=#E9E9E9
| 449913 ||  || — || June 24, 1995 || Kitt Peak || Spacewatch || — || align=right | 1.4 km || 
|-id=914 bgcolor=#fefefe
| 449914 ||  || — || December 28, 2005 || Kitt Peak || Spacewatch || — || align=right data-sort-value="0.65" | 650 m || 
|-id=915 bgcolor=#fefefe
| 449915 ||  || — || August 30, 2005 || Kitt Peak || Spacewatch || — || align=right data-sort-value="0.56" | 560 m || 
|-id=916 bgcolor=#E9E9E9
| 449916 ||  || — || February 2, 2006 || Kitt Peak || Spacewatch || — || align=right | 1.1 km || 
|-id=917 bgcolor=#d6d6d6
| 449917 ||  || — || January 19, 2008 || Kitt Peak || Spacewatch || — || align=right | 2.8 km || 
|-id=918 bgcolor=#E9E9E9
| 449918 ||  || — || September 13, 2007 || Mount Lemmon || Mount Lemmon Survey || — || align=right | 1.00 km || 
|-id=919 bgcolor=#fefefe
| 449919 ||  || — || May 23, 2011 || Kitt Peak || Spacewatch || — || align=right data-sort-value="0.84" | 840 m || 
|-id=920 bgcolor=#fefefe
| 449920 ||  || — || November 2, 2008 || Kitt Peak || Spacewatch || — || align=right data-sort-value="0.90" | 900 m || 
|-id=921 bgcolor=#fefefe
| 449921 ||  || — || March 5, 2006 || Kitt Peak || Spacewatch || — || align=right | 1.2 km || 
|-id=922 bgcolor=#d6d6d6
| 449922 Bailey ||  ||  || June 9, 2010 || WISE || WISE || — || align=right | 4.1 km || 
|-id=923 bgcolor=#d6d6d6
| 449923 ||  || — || October 22, 2005 || Kitt Peak || Spacewatch || — || align=right | 2.3 km || 
|-id=924 bgcolor=#E9E9E9
| 449924 ||  || — || December 29, 2003 || Kitt Peak || Spacewatch || — || align=right | 2.2 km || 
|-id=925 bgcolor=#fefefe
| 449925 ||  || — || November 17, 2006 || Mount Lemmon || Mount Lemmon Survey || — || align=right data-sort-value="0.70" | 700 m || 
|-id=926 bgcolor=#d6d6d6
| 449926 ||  || — || November 27, 2011 || Mount Lemmon || Mount Lemmon Survey || EMA || align=right | 2.7 km || 
|-id=927 bgcolor=#fefefe
| 449927 ||  || — || February 21, 2007 || Mount Lemmon || Mount Lemmon Survey || — || align=right data-sort-value="0.76" | 760 m || 
|-id=928 bgcolor=#fefefe
| 449928 ||  || — || October 3, 2005 || Catalina || CSS || — || align=right data-sort-value="0.98" | 980 m || 
|-id=929 bgcolor=#fefefe
| 449929 ||  || — || May 24, 2000 || Kitt Peak || Spacewatch || NYS || align=right data-sort-value="0.76" | 760 m || 
|-id=930 bgcolor=#fefefe
| 449930 ||  || — || November 8, 2008 || Mount Lemmon || Mount Lemmon Survey || — || align=right | 1.3 km || 
|-id=931 bgcolor=#E9E9E9
| 449931 ||  || — || September 13, 1994 || Kitt Peak || Spacewatch || — || align=right | 1.3 km || 
|-id=932 bgcolor=#E9E9E9
| 449932 ||  || — || April 2, 2005 || Mount Lemmon || Mount Lemmon Survey || — || align=right | 2.1 km || 
|-id=933 bgcolor=#fefefe
| 449933 ||  || — || January 27, 2007 || Mount Lemmon || Mount Lemmon Survey || NYS || align=right data-sort-value="0.70" | 700 m || 
|-id=934 bgcolor=#E9E9E9
| 449934 ||  || — || December 11, 2004 || Kitt Peak || Spacewatch || EUN || align=right | 1.4 km || 
|-id=935 bgcolor=#d6d6d6
| 449935 ||  || — || October 25, 2005 || Mount Lemmon || Mount Lemmon Survey || HYG || align=right | 2.6 km || 
|-id=936 bgcolor=#fefefe
| 449936 ||  || — || March 30, 2011 || Mount Lemmon || Mount Lemmon Survey || — || align=right data-sort-value="0.70" | 700 m || 
|-id=937 bgcolor=#E9E9E9
| 449937 ||  || — || April 30, 2006 || Kitt Peak || Spacewatch || — || align=right data-sort-value="0.98" | 980 m || 
|-id=938 bgcolor=#fefefe
| 449938 ||  || — || March 11, 2002 || Kitt Peak || Spacewatch || — || align=right data-sort-value="0.97" | 970 m || 
|-id=939 bgcolor=#E9E9E9
| 449939 ||  || — || August 29, 2006 || Catalina || CSS || GEF || align=right | 1.4 km || 
|-id=940 bgcolor=#E9E9E9
| 449940 ||  || — || October 16, 2007 || Mount Lemmon || Mount Lemmon Survey || HOF || align=right | 2.8 km || 
|-id=941 bgcolor=#d6d6d6
| 449941 ||  || — || January 30, 2008 || Mount Lemmon || Mount Lemmon Survey || BRA || align=right | 1.4 km || 
|-id=942 bgcolor=#E9E9E9
| 449942 ||  || — || December 17, 2003 || Kitt Peak || Spacewatch || WIT || align=right | 1.1 km || 
|-id=943 bgcolor=#E9E9E9
| 449943 ||  || — || March 29, 2009 || Kitt Peak || Spacewatch || — || align=right | 2.0 km || 
|-id=944 bgcolor=#E9E9E9
| 449944 ||  || — || April 7, 2006 || Kitt Peak || Spacewatch || — || align=right | 1.2 km || 
|-id=945 bgcolor=#d6d6d6
| 449945 ||  || — || December 18, 2007 || Mount Lemmon || Mount Lemmon Survey || — || align=right | 3.1 km || 
|-id=946 bgcolor=#E9E9E9
| 449946 ||  || — || October 13, 2007 || Kitt Peak || Spacewatch || — || align=right | 1.4 km || 
|-id=947 bgcolor=#fefefe
| 449947 ||  || — || September 7, 2000 || Kitt Peak || Spacewatch || — || align=right data-sort-value="0.89" | 890 m || 
|-id=948 bgcolor=#E9E9E9
| 449948 ||  || — || August 19, 2003 || Campo Imperatore || CINEOS || — || align=right data-sort-value="0.94" | 940 m || 
|-id=949 bgcolor=#E9E9E9
| 449949 ||  || — || July 3, 2011 || Mount Lemmon || Mount Lemmon Survey || — || align=right data-sort-value="0.92" | 920 m || 
|-id=950 bgcolor=#d6d6d6
| 449950 ||  || — || January 28, 2007 || Mount Lemmon || Mount Lemmon Survey || EOS || align=right | 1.8 km || 
|-id=951 bgcolor=#E9E9E9
| 449951 ||  || — || January 29, 1995 || Kitt Peak || Spacewatch || ADE || align=right | 1.6 km || 
|-id=952 bgcolor=#d6d6d6
| 449952 ||  || — || November 4, 2010 || Mount Lemmon || Mount Lemmon Survey || — || align=right | 3.3 km || 
|-id=953 bgcolor=#fefefe
| 449953 ||  || — || November 19, 2008 || Kitt Peak || Spacewatch || — || align=right data-sort-value="0.94" | 940 m || 
|-id=954 bgcolor=#d6d6d6
| 449954 ||  || — || December 7, 2005 || Kitt Peak || Spacewatch || — || align=right | 3.0 km || 
|-id=955 bgcolor=#fefefe
| 449955 ||  || — || September 11, 2007 || Mount Lemmon || Mount Lemmon Survey || — || align=right data-sort-value="0.93" | 930 m || 
|-id=956 bgcolor=#fefefe
| 449956 ||  || — || September 29, 1997 || Xinglong || SCAP || — || align=right data-sort-value="0.86" | 860 m || 
|-id=957 bgcolor=#E9E9E9
| 449957 ||  || — || March 3, 2005 || Catalina || CSS || — || align=right | 2.8 km || 
|-id=958 bgcolor=#E9E9E9
| 449958 ||  || — || August 19, 2006 || Kitt Peak || Spacewatch || — || align=right | 2.2 km || 
|-id=959 bgcolor=#E9E9E9
| 449959 ||  || — || October 15, 2007 || Catalina || CSS || EUN || align=right | 1.2 km || 
|-id=960 bgcolor=#fefefe
| 449960 ||  || — || August 23, 2008 || Kitt Peak || Spacewatch || V || align=right data-sort-value="0.69" | 690 m || 
|-id=961 bgcolor=#E9E9E9
| 449961 ||  || — || July 3, 2011 || Mount Lemmon || Mount Lemmon Survey || — || align=right | 1.5 km || 
|-id=962 bgcolor=#d6d6d6
| 449962 ||  || — || October 13, 2010 || Mount Lemmon || Mount Lemmon Survey || — || align=right | 2.8 km || 
|-id=963 bgcolor=#fefefe
| 449963 ||  || — || February 22, 2006 || Kitt Peak || Spacewatch || — || align=right | 1.1 km || 
|-id=964 bgcolor=#E9E9E9
| 449964 ||  || — || June 5, 2011 || Mount Lemmon || Mount Lemmon Survey || — || align=right | 1.4 km || 
|-id=965 bgcolor=#d6d6d6
| 449965 ||  || — || August 12, 2010 || Kitt Peak || Spacewatch || — || align=right | 2.3 km || 
|-id=966 bgcolor=#E9E9E9
| 449966 ||  || — || March 21, 2002 || Kitt Peak || Spacewatch || — || align=right data-sort-value="0.89" | 890 m || 
|-id=967 bgcolor=#E9E9E9
| 449967 ||  || — || April 13, 2010 || WISE || WISE || — || align=right | 2.6 km || 
|-id=968 bgcolor=#FA8072
| 449968 ||  || — || November 30, 2005 || Mount Lemmon || Mount Lemmon Survey || — || align=right data-sort-value="0.75" | 750 m || 
|-id=969 bgcolor=#fefefe
| 449969 ||  || — || September 20, 2001 || Kitt Peak || Spacewatch || — || align=right data-sort-value="0.77" | 770 m || 
|-id=970 bgcolor=#d6d6d6
| 449970 ||  || — || August 6, 2010 || WISE || WISE || — || align=right | 4.6 km || 
|-id=971 bgcolor=#d6d6d6
| 449971 ||  || — || August 28, 2005 || Kitt Peak || Spacewatch || EOS || align=right | 1.8 km || 
|-id=972 bgcolor=#d6d6d6
| 449972 ||  || — || September 29, 2005 || Kitt Peak || Spacewatch || EOS || align=right | 1.9 km || 
|-id=973 bgcolor=#E9E9E9
| 449973 ||  || — || February 9, 2005 || Kitt Peak || Spacewatch || — || align=right | 1.0 km || 
|-id=974 bgcolor=#E9E9E9
| 449974 ||  || — || August 19, 2006 || Kitt Peak || Spacewatch || — || align=right | 2.0 km || 
|-id=975 bgcolor=#fefefe
| 449975 ||  || — || July 30, 2008 || Kitt Peak || Spacewatch || V || align=right data-sort-value="0.52" | 520 m || 
|-id=976 bgcolor=#d6d6d6
| 449976 ||  || — || August 29, 2005 || Anderson Mesa || LONEOS || — || align=right | 2.2 km || 
|-id=977 bgcolor=#d6d6d6
| 449977 ||  || — || October 9, 2005 || Kitt Peak || Spacewatch || EOS || align=right | 1.6 km || 
|-id=978 bgcolor=#E9E9E9
| 449978 ||  || — || April 14, 2005 || Kitt Peak || Spacewatch || — || align=right | 2.2 km || 
|-id=979 bgcolor=#d6d6d6
| 449979 ||  || — || March 29, 2008 || Mount Lemmon || Mount Lemmon Survey || — || align=right | 2.6 km || 
|-id=980 bgcolor=#E9E9E9
| 449980 ||  || — || October 2, 2003 || Kitt Peak || Spacewatch || — || align=right | 1.0 km || 
|-id=981 bgcolor=#d6d6d6
| 449981 ||  || — || June 14, 2010 || WISE || WISE || — || align=right | 2.8 km || 
|-id=982 bgcolor=#d6d6d6
| 449982 ||  || — || February 6, 2007 || Mount Lemmon || Mount Lemmon Survey || — || align=right | 4.4 km || 
|-id=983 bgcolor=#fefefe
| 449983 ||  || — || November 18, 2008 || Kitt Peak || Spacewatch || — || align=right data-sort-value="0.77" | 770 m || 
|-id=984 bgcolor=#E9E9E9
| 449984 ||  || — || August 24, 1998 || Caussols || ODAS || — || align=right | 1.3 km || 
|-id=985 bgcolor=#E9E9E9
| 449985 ||  || — || July 21, 2006 || Mount Lemmon || Mount Lemmon Survey || — || align=right | 2.3 km || 
|-id=986 bgcolor=#d6d6d6
| 449986 ||  || — || January 27, 2007 || Mount Lemmon || Mount Lemmon Survey || — || align=right | 4.3 km || 
|-id=987 bgcolor=#fefefe
| 449987 ||  || — || December 7, 2005 || Catalina || CSS || — || align=right data-sort-value="0.90" | 900 m || 
|-id=988 bgcolor=#fefefe
| 449988 ||  || — || March 29, 2011 || Mount Lemmon || Mount Lemmon Survey || — || align=right data-sort-value="0.55" | 550 m || 
|-id=989 bgcolor=#E9E9E9
| 449989 ||  || — || April 13, 2010 || Catalina || CSS || — || align=right | 2.8 km || 
|-id=990 bgcolor=#E9E9E9
| 449990 ||  || — || October 19, 2011 || Kitt Peak || Spacewatch || — || align=right | 2.2 km || 
|-id=991 bgcolor=#E9E9E9
| 449991 ||  || — || October 3, 2003 || Kitt Peak || Spacewatch || (5) || align=right data-sort-value="0.51" | 510 m || 
|-id=992 bgcolor=#fefefe
| 449992 ||  || — || September 12, 2001 || Socorro || LINEAR || — || align=right data-sort-value="0.57" | 570 m || 
|-id=993 bgcolor=#d6d6d6
| 449993 ||  || — || November 27, 2006 || Mount Lemmon || Mount Lemmon Survey || — || align=right | 3.9 km || 
|-id=994 bgcolor=#d6d6d6
| 449994 ||  || — || September 16, 2010 || Mount Lemmon || Mount Lemmon Survey || EOS || align=right | 1.9 km || 
|-id=995 bgcolor=#d6d6d6
| 449995 ||  || — || December 4, 2005 || Kitt Peak || Spacewatch || — || align=right | 2.5 km || 
|-id=996 bgcolor=#fefefe
| 449996 ||  || — || June 25, 2011 || Mount Lemmon || Mount Lemmon Survey || — || align=right data-sort-value="0.87" | 870 m || 
|-id=997 bgcolor=#E9E9E9
| 449997 ||  || — || October 8, 2007 || Catalina || CSS || — || align=right data-sort-value="0.99" | 990 m || 
|-id=998 bgcolor=#d6d6d6
| 449998 ||  || — || April 4, 2008 || Mount Lemmon || Mount Lemmon Survey || VER || align=right | 2.8 km || 
|-id=999 bgcolor=#d6d6d6
| 449999 ||  || — || January 27, 2007 || Mount Lemmon || Mount Lemmon Survey || EOS || align=right | 1.9 km || 
|-id=000 bgcolor=#fefefe
| 450000 ||  || — || October 24, 2005 || Kitt Peak || Spacewatch || — || align=right data-sort-value="0.75" | 750 m || 
|}

References

External links 
 Discovery Circumstances: Numbered Minor Planets (445001)–(450000) (IAU Minor Planet Center)

0449